This is a list of Acts of the Parliament of England for the years 1660–1699.

For Acts passed during the period 1707–1800 see List of Acts of the Parliament of Great Britain. See also the List of Acts of the Parliament of Scotland, the List of Acts of the Parliament of Ireland to 1700, and the List of Acts of the Parliament of Ireland, 1701–1800.

For Acts passed from 1801 onwards see List of Acts of the Parliament of the United Kingdom.  For Acts of the devolved parliaments and assemblies in the United Kingdom, see the List of Acts of the Scottish Parliament, the List of Acts of the Northern Ireland Assembly, and the List of Acts and Measures of the National Assembly for Wales; see also the List of Acts of the Parliament of Northern Ireland.

For medieval statutes, etc. that are not considered to be Acts of Parliament, see the List of English statutes.

The number shown after each Act's title is its chapter number. Acts are cited using this number, preceded by the year(s) of the reign during which the relevant parliamentary session was held; thus the Union with Ireland Act 1800 is cited as "39 & 40 Geo. 3 c. 67", meaning the 67th Act passed during the session that started in the 39th year of the reign of George III and which finished in the 40th year of that reign. Note that the modern convention is to use Arabic numerals in citations (thus "41 Geo. 3" rather than "41 Geo. III"). Acts of the last session of the Parliament of Great Britain and the first session of the Parliament of the United Kingdom are both cited as "41 Geo. 3". Likewise, the names "Charles" and "James" (traditionally abbreviated "Car." and "Jac.", after the Latinised forms  and ) are abbreviated in modern practice as "Cha." and "Ja." respectively.

Note that although Charles II's reign began de facto with the Restoration in 1660, it was considered to have begun de jure in 1649 with the execution of Charles I; as such, the earliest act of Charles II is assigned the regnal year 12 Cha. 2.

Acts passed by the Parliament of England did not have a short title; however, some of these Acts have subsequently been given a short title by Acts of the Parliament of the United Kingdom (such as the Short Titles Act 1896).

Acts passed by the Parliament of England were deemed to have come into effect on the first day of the session in which they were passed.  Because of this, the years given in the list below may in fact be the year before a particular Act was passed.

1660–1669

1660 (12 Cha. 2)
Session of the Convention Parliament (1660) (25 April 1660 – 29 December 1660)

Public Acts

| {{|Taxation Act 1660|public|2|01-06-1660|note3=|repealed=y|archived=n|An Act for putting in execution an Ordinance mentioned in this Act.|note4= }}

| {{|Continuance of Process, etc. Act 1660|public|3|01-06-1660|note3=|repealed=y|archived=n|An Act for the Continuance of Processe and Judiciall Proceedings.|note4= }}

| {{|Subsidy Act 1660|public|4|28-07-1660|note3=|repealed=y|archived=n|A Subsidy granted to the King of Tonnage and Poundage and other summes of Money payable upon Merchandize Exported and Imported.}}

| {{|Excise Act 1660|public|5|28-07-1660|note3=|repealed=y|archived=n|An Act for continuing the Excise untill the twentyeth of August One thousand six hundred & sixty.|note4= }}

| {{|Commissioners of Sewers Act 1660|public|6|28-07-1660|note3=|repealed=y|archived=n|An Act for the present Nominating of Commissioners of Sewers.|note4= }}

| {{|Lord Ormond (Restoration of Lands, etc., in Ireland) Act 1660|public|7|note2=|28-07-1660|note3=|repealed=y|archived=n|An Act for restoreing unto James Marquesse of Ormond all his Honours Mannours Land and Tenements in Ireland whereof he was in Possession on the twenty-third Day of October one thousand six hundred fourty-one, or at any Time since.|note4= }}

| {{|Excise Act 1660|public|8|18-08-1660|note3=|repealed=y|archived=n|An Act for continuing of the Excise till the five and twentyeth day of December One thousand six hundred and sixty.|note4= }}

| {{|Taxation Act 1660|public|9|29-08-1660|note3=|repealed=y|archived=n|An Act for the speedy provision of money for disbanding and paying off the forces of this Kingdome both by Land and Sea.|note4= }}

| {{|Taxation Act 1660|public|10|13-09-1660|note3=|repealed=y|archived=n|An Act for supplying and explaining certaine defects in an Act entituled An Act for the speedy provision of money for disbanding and paying off the forces of this kingdome both by Land and Sea.|note4= }}

| {{|Indemnity and Oblivion Act|public|11|29-08-1660|note3=|repealed=y|archived=n|An Act of Free and Generall Pardon, Indemnity, and Oblivion.}}

| {{|Legal Proceedings During Commonwealth Act 1660|public|12|29-08-1660|note3=|repealed=y|archived=n|An Act for Confirmation of Judiciall Proceedings.}}

| {{|Usury Act 1660|public|13|29-08-1660|note3=|repealed=y|archived=n|An Act for restraining the takeing of Excessive Usury.}}

| {{|Observance of 29th May Act 1660|public|14|29-08-1660|note3=|repealed=y|archived=n|An Act for a Perpetuall Anniversary Thanksgiveing on the nine and twentieth day of May.}}

| {{|Disbanding of the Army Act 1660|public|15|13-09-1660|note3=|repealed=y|archived=n|An Act for the speedy disbanding of the Army and Garrisons of this Kingdome.|note4= }}

| {{|Disbanded Soldiers Act 1660|public|16|13-09-1660|note3=|repealed=y|archived=n|An Act for inabling the Souldiers of the Army now to be disbanded to exercise Trades.|note4= }}

| {{|Restoring of Ministers Act 1660|public|17|13-09-1660|note3=|repealed=y|archived=n|An Act for the Confirming and Restoreing of Ministers.|note4= }}

| {{|Navigation Act 1660|public|18|13-09-1660|note3=|repealed=y|archived=n|An Act for the Encourageing and increasing of Shipping and Navigation.}}

| {{|Customs Act 1660|public|19|13-09-1660|note3=|repealed=y|archived=n|An Act to prevent Fraudes and Concealments of His Majestyes Customes and Subsidyes.}}

| {{|Taxation Act 1660|public|20|13-09-1660|note3=|repealed=y|archived=n|An Act for raising seavenscore thousand pounds for the compleate disbanding of the whole Army and paying off some part of the Navy.|note4= }}

| {{|Taxation Act 1660|public|21|13-09-1660|note3=|repealed=y|archived=n|An Act for the speedy raising of Seaventy thousand pounds for the present Supply of his Majestye.|note4= }}

| {{|Bay Making, Colchester Act 1660|public|22|13-09-1660|note3=|repealed=y|archived=n|An Act for the Regulating of the Trade of Bay makeing in the Dutchy Bay Hall in Colchester.|note4= }}

| {{|Excise Act 1660|public|23|24-12-1660|note3=|repealed=y|archived=n|A Grant of certaine Impositions upon Beere Ale and other Liquors for the encrease of His Majestyes Revenue during His Life.|note4= }}

| {{|Tenures Abolition Act 1660|public|24|24-12-1660|note3=|repealed=n|archived=n|An Act takeing away the Court of Wards and Liveries and Tenures in Capite and by Knights Service and Purveyance, and for setling a Revenue upon His Majesty in Lieu thereof.}}

| {{|Wine Act 1660|public|25|29-12-1660|note3=|repealed=y|archived=n|An Act for the better Ordering the Selling of Wines by Retaile, and for preventing Abuses in the Mingling Corrupting and Vitiating of Wines, and for Setting and Limitting the Prices of the same.|note4= }}

| {{|Taxation Act 1660|public|26|29-12-1660|note3=|repealed=y|archived=n|An Act for the levying of the Arreares of the twelve months Assessment commencing the 24th of June 1659, and the Six Months Assessment commencing the 25th of December 1659.|note4= }}

| {{|Taxation Act 1660|public|27|29-12-1660|note3=|repealed=y|archived=n|An Act for granting unto the Kings Majestic Fower hundred and twenty thousand pounds by an Assessment of three score and ten thousand pounds by the moneth for six moneths for disbanding the remainder of the Army, and paying off the Navy.|note4= }}

| {{|Taxation Act 1660|public|28|29-12-1660|note3=|repealed=y|archived=n|An Act for further suplying and explaining certaine defects in an Act intituled An Act for the speedy provision of money for disbanding and paying off the forces of this kingdome both by land and sea.|note4= }}

| {{|Taxation Act 1660|public|29|29-12-1660|note3=|repealed=y|archived=n|An Act for the raiseing of seaventy thousand pounds for the further supply of his Majestie.|note4= }}

| {{|Attainder of the Regicides, etc. Act 1660|public|30|29-12-1660|note3=|repealed=y|archived=n|An Act for the Attainder of severall persons guilty of the horrid Murther of his late Sacred Majestie King Charles the first.}}

| {{|Colleges and Hospitals (Leases and Grants Confirmed) Act 1660|public|31|29-12-1660|note3=|repealed=y|archived=n|An Act for Confirmation of Leases and Grants from Colledges and Hospitalls.}}

| {{|Exportation Act 1660|public|32|29-12-1660|note3=|repealed=y|archived=n|An Act for prohibiting the Exportation of Wooll, Woolfells, Fullers Earth, or any kinde of Scouring Earth.|note4= }}

| {{|Confirmation of Marriages Act 1660|public|33|29-12-1660|note3=|repealed=y|archived=n|An Act for Confirmation of Marriages.|note4= }}

| {{|Tobacco Planting and Sowing Act 1660|public|34|29-12-1660|note3=|repealed=y|archived=n|An Act for Prohibiting the Planting Setting or Sowing of Tobaccho in England and Ireland.}}

| {{|Post Office Act 1660|public|35|29-12-1660|note3=|repealed=y|archived=n|An Act for Erecting and Establishing a Post Office.|note4= }}

| {{|The Rolls Estate Act 1660|public|36|29-12-1660|note3=|repealed=y|archived=n|An Act impowering the Master of the Rolls for the time being to make Leases for yeares in order to new build the old houses belonging to the Rolls.}}
}}

Private Acts

| {{|Great Level of the Fens Drainage Act 1660|private|2|13-09-1660|note3=|repealed=n|archived=n|An Act for the necessary Maintenance of the Work of Draining the Great Level of the Fens.}}

| {{|Earl of Inchequin: restoration of honours, manors, lands and tenements in Ireland.|private|3|13-09-1660|note3=|repealed=n|archived=n|An Act for restoring unto Murrough, alias Morgan, Earl of Insiquin, all his Honours, Manors, Lands, and Tenements, in Ireland, whereof he was in Possession on the 23th of October, 1641, or at any Time since.}}

| {{|Restoration of Marquis of Newcastle Act 1660|private|4|13-09-1660|note3=|repealed=n|archived=n|An Act for restoring unto William Marquis of Newcastle, all his Honours, Manors, Lands, and Tenements, in England, whereof he was in Possession on the 20th Day of May, 1640, or at any Time since.}}

| {{|Earl of Winchelsea's estate: settling priory of Walton and other lands (Yorkshire) in trustees for payment of debts.|private|5|13-09-1660|note3=|repealed=n|archived=n|An Act for the settling of the Priory of Watton, and other Lands belonging to the Earl of Winchilsea, in the County of Yorke, in the Hands of Trustees, for the Payment of Debts.}}

| {{|Sir George Lane: restoration of manors of Rathclive and Lisduff and other lands in Ireland.|private|6|13-09-1660|note3=|repealed=n|archived=n|An Act for restoring of Sir George Lane Knight, to the Possession of the Manor of Kathclyne and Lisduffe, and other Lands in Ireland.}}

| {{|Bays Regulation (Colchester) Act 1660|private|7|13-09-1660|note3=|repealed=n|archived=n|An Act for the regulating of the Trade of Bay-making, in the Dutch Bay Hall, in Colchester.}}

| {{|Lord Gerrard: restoration of honours, manors and lands.|private|8|13-09-1660|note3=|repealed=n|archived=n|An Act for restoring to Charles Lord Gerard, Baron of Brandon, all his Honours, Manors, Lands, Tenements, and Hereditaments, whereof he was in Possession on the 20th Day of May, 1642, or at any Time sithence.}}

| {{|Restoratation of Lord Colepeper Act 1660|private|9|13-09-1660|note3=|repealed=n|archived=n|An Act for restoring to Thomas Lord Culpeper, Son and Heir and Sole Executor of John Lord Culpeper, Baron of Thorswey, and Master of the Rolls, deceased, all the Honours, Manors, Lands, and Tenements, Leases not determined, and Hereditaments whatsoever, whereof the said John Lord Culpeper was in Possession on the 20th Day of May, 1642, or at any Time after, which have not been since sold or aliened by the said John late Lord Culpeper, by Acts or Assurances to which himself was Party and consenting.}}

| {{|Restoration of Marquis of Hertford Act 1660|private|10|13-09-1660|note3=|repealed=n|archived=n|An Act for the restoring of the Marquis of Hertford to the Dukedom of Somersett.}}

| {{|Augustine and William Skinner's estate: power to sell land for payment of debts.|private|11|13-09-1660|note3=|repealed=n|archived=n|An Act for enabling Augustine Skynner and Wm. Skynner to make Sale of some Lands, for Payment of Debts.}}

| {{|Adams School, Newport Act 1660|private|12|13-09-1660|note3=|repealed=n|archived=n|An Act for the incorporating of the Master and Wardens of the Company of Haberdashers, London, to be Governors of the Free School and Almshouses at Newport.}}

| {{|Naturalization of Countess of Derby, Countess of Ossory, Lady Culpeper, Lord Wotton and Dame Emilia Kirkhoven|private|13|13-09-1660|note3=|repealed=n|archived=n|An Act for the naturalizing of Dorothea Helena Countess of Derby, Wife of the Right Honourable Charles Earl of Derby; and Emelia called Countess of Ossery, Wife of the Right Honourable Thomas Butler, called Earl of Ossery, Son and Heir Apparent to the Right Honourable James Marquis of Ordmond and Earl of Brecknock; and Margarett Lady Culpeper, Wife of the Right Honourable Thomas Lord Culpeper, Baron of Thorsway; and the Right Honourable Charles Kirkhoven Lord Wotton, and Dame Emilia his Sister, Children of Katherin Stanhope Countess of Chesterfeild, by John Kirkhoven, Lord of Hemfleet.}}

| {{|Estate of Sir George Booth Act 1660|private|14|13-09-1660|note3=|repealed=n|archived=n|An Act for enabling of Sir George Booth Baronet to make Leases and Sales of Part of his Estate.}}

| {{|Lord Ormond (Restoration of Lands, etc., in Ireland) Act 1660|private|15|note2=|28-07-1660|note3=|repealed=y|archived=n|An Act for restoreing unto James Marquesse of Ormond all his Honours Mannours Land and Tenements in Ireland whereof he was in Possession on the twenty-third Day of October one thousand six hundred fourty-one, or at any Time since.|note4= }}

| {{|Henry Lord Arundell of Wardour (Restoration of Estate) Act 1660|private|16|29-12-1660|note3=|repealed=n|archived=n|An Act for the restoring of Henry Lord Arrundell of Warder to the Possession of his Estate.}}

| {{|Thomas Earl of Arundel, Surrey and Norfolk: restitution to Dukedom of Norfolk.|private|17|29-12-1660|note3=|repealed=n|archived=n|An Act for Restitution of Thomas Earl of Arrundell, Surrey, and Norfolke, to the Dignity and Title of Duke of Norfolke.}}

| {{|Wentworth Earl of Roscomon: restoration of honours, manors and lands in Ireland.|private|18|29-12-1660|note3=|repealed=n|archived=n|An Act to restore to Wentworth Earl of Roscomon, of the Kingdom of Ireland, all the Honours, Castles, Lordships, Lands, Tenements, and Hereditaments, in Ireland, whereof James Earl of Roscomon his Great Grandfather, or James Earl of Roscomon his Father, were in Possession on the 23th of October, 1641}}

| {{|John Newton and William Oakeley estates: sale of land for payment of debts and raising portions.|private|19|29-12-1660|note3=|repealed=n|archived=n|An Act for enabling of John Newton the Younger, and William Oakeley, to make Sale of Lands, for Payment of Debts, and raising of Portions, &c.}}

| {{|Sir George Hamilton: restoration of lands and estates in Ireland.|private|20|29-12-1660|note3=|repealed=n|archived=n|An Act for restoring Sir George Hamilton unto his Lands and Estate in Ireland.}}

| {{|Maintenance of Vicar of Royston (Hertfordshire and Cambridgeshire) and his successors.|private|21|29-12-1660|note3=|repealed=n|archived=n|An Act for Maintenance of the Vicar for the Time being of the Vicarage of Royston, in the Counties of Hertford and Cambridge, and of his Successors Vicars of the said Vicarage.}}

| {{|Sir William Wray's estate: sale of land for payment of debts and raising of portions for younger children.|private|22|29-12-1660|note3=|repealed=n|archived=n|An Act for enabling Sir William Wray to sell Lands, for Payment of his Debts, and raising of Portions for his Younger Children.}}

| {{|Naturalization of Gerrard Vantethusen, Daniel Demetrius, Theodore Cocke, John Cravenburgh and others.|private|23|29-12-1660|note3=|repealed=n|archived=n|An Act for naturalizing of Gerard Vantenhussens, Daniell Demetrius, and others.}}

| {{|Levying monies due on the collection for the Protestants of Piedmont.|private|24|29-12-1660|note3=|repealed=n|archived=n|An Act for the levying of certain Monies, for the Protestants of Piedmont.}}

| {{|Naturalization of John Boreel.|private|25|29-12-1660|note3=|repealed=n|archived=n|An Act for the Naturalization of John Boreel, Esquire, Eldest Son of Sir William Boreel Knight and Baronet.}}

| {{|Naturalization of Abraham Watchtor.|private|26|29-12-1660|note3=|repealed=n|archived=n|An Act for the Naturalization of Abraham Wachter, born beyond the Sea.}}

| {{|Sir Thomas Grimes: restoration of his estate.|private|27|29-12-1660|note3=|repealed=n|archived=n|An Act for restoring of Sir Thomas Grymes Baronet to his Estate.}}

| {{|George Faunt's estate: sale of land for payment of debts and legacies charged thereon by Sir William Faunt deceased, for raising portions for younger children and providing a jointure for his wife.|private|28|29-12-1660|note3=|repealed=n|archived=n|An Act for enabling George Faunt, of Foston, in the County of Leicester, Esquire, to sell and convey Part of his Lands, for Payment of several Debts and Legacies, charged upon his Estate by Sir William Faunt Knight, deceased; and for the raising of Portions for his younger Children, and for the making his Wife a Jointure.}}

| {{|Naturalization of Frances Hyde and others.|private|29|29-12-1660|note3=|repealed=n|archived=n|An Act for naturalizing of Francis Hyde, &c.}}

| {{|Joseph Micklethwaite's (infant) estate: sale of land for payment of father's debts.|private|30|29-12-1660|note3=|repealed=n|archived=n|An Act to enable Joseph Mickletwayte, an Insant, and his Trustees, to sell Land, for Payment of his Father's Debts.}}

| {{|Raising portions and provision for maintenance for the younger children of Sir Edward Gostwicke.|private|31|29-12-1660|note3=|repealed=n|archived=n|An Act for raising Portions, and making Provision for Maintenance, for the younger Children of Sir Edward Gostwicke.}}

| {{|Confirmation of sale of manor of Hitcham by Sir John Clarke to Charles Doe and settlement and disposition of other lands of him and his wife Dame Philodelphia.|private|32|29-12-1660|note3=|repealed=n|archived=n|An Act for confirming the Sale of the Manor of Hitcham, sold to Charles Doe by Sir John Clarke Knight and Baronet; and for settling and disposing other Lands of the said Sir John Clarke and Dame Philadelphia his Wife.}}

| {{|Disappropriating Preston (Lancashire) rectory, uniting and consolidating the rectory and vicarage and assuring the advowson to Emmanuel College, Cambridge.|private|34|29-12-1660|note3=|repealed=n|archived=n|An Act for the disappropriating of the Rectory Appropriate of Preston, and uniting and consolidating of the said Rectory, and of the Vicarage of the Church of Preston, and for assuring of the Advowson and Right of Patronage of the same unto the Master, Fellows, and Scholars, of Emanuell Colledge, in Cambridge, and their Successors.}}

| {{|Precinct of Covent Garden Act 1660|private|35|29-12-1660|note3=|repealed=n|archived=n| An Act for making the Precinct of Covent Garden Parochial.}}

}}

1661

13 Cha. 2 St. 1

First session of the Cavalier Parliament (8 May 1661 – 30 July 1661)

Public Acts

| {{|Clergy Act 1661|public|2|30-07-1661|note3=|repealed=y|archived=n|An Act for Repeal of an Act of Parliament Entituled "An Act for disenabling all persons in Holy Orders to exercise any Temporall Jurisdiccion or Authority".|note4= }}

| {{|Vesting of Certain Moneys, etc. in the King Act 1661|public|3|30-07-1661|note3=|repealed=y|archived=n|An Act for the declaring vesting and setling of all such Moneys Goods and other things in His Majesty which were received levied or collected in these late times, and are remaining in the Hands or Possession of any Treasurers or Receivers, Collectors, or others, not pardoned by the Act of Oblivion.|note4= }}

| {{|Illegality of Benevolences, etc. Act 1661|public|4|08-07-1661|note3=|repealed=n|archived=n|An Act for a free and voluntary present to his Majesty.}}

| {{|Tumultuous Petitioning Act 1661|public|5|30-07-1661|note3=|repealed=y|archived=n|An Act against Tumults and Disorders upon pretence of preparing or presenting Peticions or other Addresses to His Majesty or the Parliament.}}

| {{|The King's Sole Right over the Militia Act 1661|public|6|30-07-1661|note3=|repealed=y|archived=n|An Act declaring the sole Right of the Militia to be in King and for the present ordering & disposing the same.}}

| {{|Confirmation of Acts Act 1661|public|7|08-07-1661|note3=|repealed=y|archived=n|An Act for confirming Publique Acts.|note4= }}

| {{|Provision for the King's Journeys Act 1661|public|8|30-07-1661|note3=|repealed=y|archived=n|An Act for providing necessary Carriages for His Majestie in His Royall Progresse and Removalls.|note4= }}

| {{|Navy Act 1661|public|9|30-07-1661|note3=|repealed=y|archived=n|An Act for the Establishing Articles and Orders for the regulateing and better Government of His Majesties Navies Ships of Warr & Forces by Sea.}}

| {{|Hunting of Deer Act 1661|public|10|30-07-1661|note3=|repealed=y|archived=n|An Act to prevent the unlawfull Coursing Hurting or Killing of Deere.}}

| {{|Confirmation of Acts Act 1661|public|11|30-07-1661|note3=|repealed=y|archived=n|An Act for Confirming of three Acts therein mentioned.|note4= }}

| {{|Ecclesiastical Jurisdiction Act 1661|public|12|30-07-1661|note3=|repealed=y|archived=n|An Act for Explanation of a Clause contained in Act of Parliament made in the Seventeenth Year of the late King Charles Entituled An Act for Repeal of a Branch of a Statute Primo Elizabethe concerning Commissioners for Causes Ecclesiasticall.}}

| {{|Arrears of Excise Act 1661|public|13|30-07-1661|note3=|repealed=y|archived=n|An Act for vesting the Arreares of the Excise and New Impost in His Majesty.|note4= }}

| {{|Confirmation of Acts Act 1661|public|14|30-07-1661|note3=|repealed=y|archived=n|An Act for Confirming an Act Entituled An Act for encouraging and encreasing of Shipping & Navigation and severall other Acts both publique and private mentioned therein.|note4= }}

| {{|Legal Proceedings during Commonwealth Act 1661|public|15|30-07-1661|note3=|repealed=y|archived=n|An Act declaring the Paines Penalties and Forfeitures imposed upon the Estates and Persons of certaine notorious Offenders excepted out of the Act of Free and Generall Pardon Indempnity and Oblivion.}}
}}

Private Acts

| {{|Confirmation of sale of manor of Holm and certain lands in Manchester by Sir Thomas Prestwich to Sir Edward Mosely.|private|2|30-07-1661|note3=|repealed=n|archived=n|An Act for confirming a Sale made, by Sir Thomas Prestwich and others, of the Manor of Holme, and certain Lands in the Parish of Manchester, in the County of Lancaster, unto Sir Edward Mosely Baronet.}}

| {{|Thomas Radcliffe: restoration of lands and possessions in England and Ireland.|private|3|30-07-1661|note3=|repealed=n|archived=n|An Act for restoring of Thomas Radcliffe Esquire to all his Lands and Possessions in England and Ireland.}}

| {{|John Harbin's estate: sale of lands in Somerset and Dorset for payment of debts and provision for younger children.|private|4|30-07-1661|note3=|repealed=n|archived=n|An Act, enabling John Harbin Esquire to settle, sell, and dispose of, several Manors, Messuages, Lands, Tenements, and Hereditaments, with the Appurtenances in the County of Somersett and Dorsett, therein mentioned, for Payment of his Debts, and to make Provision for his younger Children.}}

| {{|Thomas and John Hunt's estate: sale of land for payment of debts.|private|5|30-07-1661|note3=|repealed=n|archived=n|An Act to enable the Sale of some of the Lands of Thomas Hunt Esquire and John Hunt Gentleman, for Payment of his Debts.}}

| {{|Settling manors of Knoll, Seale and Kempsing (Kent) upon Earl of Dorset and heirs and charging manors of Bexhill and Cowding and other lands (Sussex) with a yearly rentcharge of £130 in lieu.|private|6|30-07-1661|note3=|repealed=n|archived=n|An Act for settling the Manors of Knoll, Seale, and Kempsing, in the County of Kent, upon the Earl of Dorsett and his Heirs, and charging the Manor of Bexhill, and the Manor or Farm of Cowding, and other Lands in the County of Sussex, with a Rent Charge of One Hundred and Thirty Pounds per Annum, in Lieu thereof.}}

| {{|Worcester weavers, fullers and clothiers: confirmation of charter and privileges.|private|7|30-07-1661|note3=|repealed=n|archived=n|An Act for Confirmation of the Charter and Privileges of the Master, Wardens, and Commonalty of Weavers, Fullers, and Clothiers, in the City of Worcester.}}

| {{|Sir Edward Baesh's estate: settling lands upon his heir Sir Ralph Baesh.|private|8|30-07-1661|note3=|repealed=n|archived=n|An Act for settling several Lands, late of Sir Edward Baesh Knight, upon Sir Ralph Baesh, Knight of the Bath, Heir of the said Sir Edward, and his Heirs.}}

| {{|Confirmation and explanation of an Act for sale of some of the manors and lands of Earl of Cleveland for payment of his debts and those of his son Thomas Lord Wentworth.|private|9|30-07-1661|note3=|repealed=n|archived=n|An Act for Confirmation and Explanation of an Act for the settling of some of the Manors and Lands of the Earl of Cleveland in Trustees, to be sold, for the Satisfaction of the Debts of the said Earl, and Thomas Lord Wentworth his Son.}}

| {{|Uniting parsonages of St. Andrews and St. Mary Witton in Droitwich (Worcestershire).|private|10|30-07-1661|note3=|repealed=n|archived=n|An Act for the uniting the Parsonages of St. Andrewes and St. Mary Witton, in Droitwich, in the County of Worcester.}}

| {{|John Lord Abergavenny's estate: sale of lands for payment of debts and preferment of siblings.|private|11|30-07-1661|note3=|repealed=n|archived=n|An Act to enable John Lord Abergaveny, Son and Heir of Henry late Lord Abergaveny, to sell certain Lands, for Payment of his Debts, and Preferment of his Brother and Sisters.}}

| {{|Naturalization of Francis Brudenell and Anna Countess of Shrewsbury.|private|12|30-07-1661|note3=|repealed=n|archived=n|An Act for the naturalizing of Francis Brudnell Esquire, Son and Heir Apparent of the Right Honourable Robert Lord Brudenell, and of the Right Honourable Anna Maria Countess of Shrewsbury, Daughter of the said Lord Brudnell, and now Wife of the Right Honourable Francis Earl of Shrewsbury.}}

| {{|Reviving a settlement of certain lands on John Orlibeare for life with the remainder to his sons and to their male heirs.|private|13|30-07-1661|note3=|repealed=n|archived=n|An Act for the reviving a Settlement of certain Lands on John Orlibeare, for Life; the Remainder to the Sons of the said John successively, and the Heirs Males of their Bodies, &c.}}

| {{|Confirming and continuing an Act for draining the Great Level of the Fens.|private|14|30-07-1661|note3=|repealed=n|archived=n|An Act for confirming and continuing an Act, for the necessary Maintenance of the Work of draining the Great Level of the Fens.}}

| {{|Inclosing of former common highway from Parsons Green to Southfield in Fulham and settling other land for a common highway in lieu.|private|15|30-07-1661|note3=|repealed=n|archived=n|An Act for confirming of an Enclosure of Land, formerly used for a Common Highway, from Parsons Greene, to Southfeild, in Fulham; and the settling of other Land for a Common Highway there, in Lieu thereof.}}

| {{|Richard Gipps' estate: sale of lands and tenements in Suffolk and Norfolk for payment of debts and provision of portions for younger children.|private|16|30-07-1661|note3=|repealed=n|archived=n|An Act enabling Trustees to sell certain Lands and Tenements, in the Counties of Suffolk and Norfolk, for Payment of the Debts of Richard Gippes Esquire, and providing Portions for his Younger Children.}}
}}

13 Cha. 2 St. 2

First session (continued) of the Cavalier Parliament (20 November 1661 – 30 December 1661)

Public Acts

| {{|Vexatious Arrests and Delays at Law Act 1661|public|2|20-12-1661|repealed=y|archived=n|An Act for prevention of Vexations and Oppressions by Arrests and of Delaies in Suits of Law.}}

| {{|Taxation Act 1661|public|3|20-12-1661|repealed=y|archived=n|An Act for granting unto the Kings Majestie twelve hundred and threescore thousand pounds to bee assessed and levied by an assessment of threescore and ten thousand pounds by the moneth for eighteene months.|note4= }}

| {{|Cornwall Duchy Act 1661|public|4|20-12-1661|repealed=y|archived=n|An Act to enable the Kings Majestie to make Leases Grants and Copies of Offices Lands Tenements and Hereditaments parcell of his Highnes Dutchy of Cornwall or annexed to the same and for Confirmacion of Leases and Grants already made.}}
}}

Private Acts

| {{|Division of Trinity Church, Hull, from Hessle.|private|2|20-12-1661|repealed=n|archived=n|An Act for dividing Trynity Church, in Kingston upon Hull, from Hassle.}}
| {{|Sale of Algernon Peyton's Estate|private|3|20-12-1661|repealed=n|archived=n|An Act for enabling Algernon Peyton, Doctor of Divinity, to make Sale of Part of his Lands, for Payment of Debts.}}
| {{|Confirmation of an Act for restitution of Thomas Earl of Arundel, Surrey and Norfolk to the Dukedom of Norfolk.|private|4|20-12-1661|repealed=n|archived=n|An Act confirming an Act for Restitution of Thomas Earl of Arundell, Surrey, and Norfolke, to the Dignity and Title of Duke of Norfolke.}}
| {{|Confirmation of Private Acts Act 1661|private|5|20-12-1661|repealed=n|archived=n|An Act for confirming Private Acts.}}
}}

1662 (14 Cha. 2)

First session (continued) of Cavalier Parliament (7 January 1662 – 19 May 1662)

Label given as "14 Car. 2" (14 Cha. 2) in Statutes of the Realm, and "13 & 14 Car. 2" (13 & 14 Cha. 2) in Ruffhead-Pickering Statutes at Large.

Public Acts

| {{|Streets, London and Westminster Act 1662|public|2|02-05-1662|repealed=y|archived=n|An Act for repairing the High wayes and Sewers and for paving and keeping clean of the Streets in and about the Cities of London & Westminster and for reforming of Annoyances and Disorders in the Streets of and places adjacent to the said Cities and for the Regulating and Licensing of Hackney Coaches and for the enlarging of several strait & inconvenient Streets and Passages.}}

| {{|City of London Militia Act 1662|public|3|19-05-1662|note3=|repealed=n|archived=n|An Act for ordering the Forces in the several Counties of this Kingdom.}}

| {{|Act of Uniformity 1662|public|4|19-05-1662|note3=|repealed=n|archived=n|An Act for the Uniformity of Publique Prayers and Administracion of Sacramentes & other Rites & Ceremonies and for establishing the Form of making ordaining and consecrating Bishops Preists and Deacons in the Church of England.}}

| {{|Making of Stuffs in Norfolk and Norwich Act 1662|public|5|19-05-1662|note3=|repealed=y|archived=n|An Act for regulating the making of Stuffs in Norfolke and Norwich.}}

| {{|Highways Act 1662|public|6|19-05-1662|note3=|repealed=y|archived=n|An Act for enlarging and repairing of Common Highwayes.}}

| {{|Exportation of Leather Act 1662|public|7|19-05-1662|note3=|repealed=y|archived=n|An Act to restrain the Exportation of Leather and Raw Hides out of the Realme of England.}}

| {{|Distribution To Loyal Indigent Officers Act 1662|public|8|19-05-1662|note3=|repealed=y|archived=n|An Act for Distribution of Threescore thousand pounds amongst the truly Loyal & Indigent Commission Officers and for assessing of Offices and distributing the Moneys thereby raised for theire further supply.}}

| {{|Relief of Poor and Maimed Officers and Soldiers Act 1662|public|9|19-05-1662|note3=|repealed=y|archived=n|An Act for the releife of poore and maimed Officers and Souldiers who have faithfully served His Majesty and His Royal Father in the late Wars.}}

| {{|Customs Act 1662|public|11|19-05-1662|note3=|repealed=y|archived=n|An Act for preventing Frauds and regulating Abuses in His Majesties Customes.}}

| {{|Poor Relief Act 1662|public|12|19-05-1662|note3=|repealed=y|archived=n|An Acte for the better Releife of the Poore of this Kingdom.}}

| {{|Foreign Bone-lace, etc. Act 1662|public|13|19-05-1662|note3=|repealed=y|archived=n|An Act prohibiting the Importacion of Forreign Bonelace Cutt worke Imbroidery Fringe Band-strings Buttons and Needle worke.}}

| {{|Prize Goods Act 1662|public|14|19-05-1662|note3=|repealed=y|archived=n|An Act directing the Prosecution of such as are accomptable for Prize Goods}}

| {{|Silk Throwing Act 1662|public|15|19-05-1662|note3=|repealed=y|archived=n|An Act for regulating the Trade of Silk throwing.}}

| {{|Accountants Expected from Act of Oblivion Act 1662|public|16|19-05-1662|note3=|repealed=y|archived=n|An Act for the more speedy and effectual bringing those persons to accompt whose Accompts are excepted in the Act of Oblivion.}}

| {{|Collectors of Public Money Act 1662|public|17|19-05-1662|note3=|repealed=y|archived=n|An Act for Releife of Collectors of Publick Moneys and theire Assistants and Deputies.}}

| {{|Wool Act 1662|public|18|19-05-1662|note3=|repealed=y|archived=n|An Act against exporting of Sheepe Wooll Woolfells Mortlings Shorlings Yarn made of Wool Woolflocks Fullers Earth Fulling Clay and Tobacco pipe Clay.|note4= }}

| {{|Foreign Wool-cards etc. Act 1662|public|19|19-05-1662|note3=|repealed=y|archived=n|An Act against importing of Foreign Wool cards Card wire or Iron wire.}}

| {{|Navy and Ordnance Act 1662|public|20|19-05-1662|note3=|repealed=y|archived=n|An Act for providing Carriage by Land and by Water for the use of His Majesties Navy and Ordnance.}}

| {{|Expenses of Sheriffs Act 1662|public|21|19-05-1662|note3=|repealed=y|archived=n|An Act for preventing the unnecessary charge of Sheriffes and for ease in passing theire Accompts.}}

| {{|Moss Troopers Act 1662|public|22|19-05-1662|note3=|repealed=y|archived=n|An Act for preventing of Theft and Rapine upon the Northern Borders of England}}

| {{|Policies of Assurance Act 1662|public|23|19-05-1662|note3=|repealed=y|archived=n|An Addicional Act concerning matters of Assurance used amongst Merchants.}}

| {{|Bankrupts Act 1662|public|24|19-05-1662|note3=|repealed=y|archived=n|An Act declaratory concerning Bankrupts.}}

| {{|Legal Proceedings During Commonwealth Act 1662|public|25|19-05-1662|note3=|repealed=y|archived=n|An Act for the restoring of all such Advowsons Rectories Impropriate Gleeb Lands & Tithes to His Majesties Loyal Subjects as were taken from them and making void certain charges imposed on them upon theire Compositions for Delinquency by the late usurped Powers.}}

| {{|Packing of Butter Act 1662|public|26|19-05-1662|note3=|repealed=y|archived=n|An Act for reforming of Abuses committed in the Weight and false Packing of Butter.}}

| {{|Dover Harbour Repairs Act 1662|public|27|19-05-1662|note3=|repealed=y|archived=n|An Act for repairing of Dover Harbour.}}

| {{|Pilchard Fishing Act 1662|public|28|19-05-1662|note3=|repealed=y|archived=n|An Act for the regulating of the Pilchard Fishing in the Counties of Devon and Cornwall}}

| {{|Strafford Attainder Act 1662|public|29|note2=|19-05-1662|note3=|repealed=y|archived=n|An Act for the reversing the Earle of Strafford his Attainder.}}

| {{|Madder Act 1662|public|30|19-05-1662|note3=|repealed=y|archived=n|An Act for the importing of Madder pure and unmixed.}}

| {{|Coin Act 1662|public|31|19-05-1662|note3=|repealed=y|archived=n|An Act to prevent the Inconvenience arising by melting the Silver Coyn of this Realm.}}

| {{|Woollen Cloth Act 1662|public|32|19-05-1662|note3=|repealed=y|archived=n|An Act for the better regulating of the Manufacture of Broad Woollen Cloath within the West Riding of the County of Yorke.}}

| {{|Licensing of the Press Act 1662|public|33|19-05-1662|note3=|repealed=y|archived=n|An Act for preventing the frequent Abuses in printing seditious treasonable and unlicensed Books and Pamphlets and for regulating of Printing and Printing Presses}}

}}

Private Acts

| {{|Duke of Albemarle: confirmation of letters patent granting him honours, manors and hereditaments.|private|2|19-05-1662|note3=|repealed=n|archived=n|n Act for Confirmation of certain Letters Patents made, and to be made, to the Right Noble Lord George Duke of Albemarle, of several Honours, Manors, and Hereditaments, granted, or mentioned to be granted, to him by His Majesty.}}

| {{|Confirmation of John Marquis of Winchester's estate in certain manors and lands whose deeds and evidences were burnt and lost at the taking of Basing Castle (Hampshire).|private|3|19-05-1662|note3=|repealed=n|archived=n|An Act for confirming the Estate of John Marquis of Winchester, in certain Manors and Lands whereof the Deeds and Evidences were burnt and lost at the Taking of the Castle of Basing.}}

| {{|Ferdinando Earl of Huntingdon's estate: confirmation of sale of land for payment of his and his father's debts.|private|4|19-05-1662|note3=|repealed=n|archived=n|An Act to confirm the Sale of certain Lands, sold by Ferdinando late Earl of Huntingdon, for the Payment of his own and his Father's Debts."}}

| {{|Strafford Attainder Act 1662|private|5|note2=|19-05-1662|note3=|repealed=y|archived=n|An Act for the reversing the Earle of Strafford his Attainder.|note4=}}

| {{|Settling upon Viscount Campden a mansion house in Kensington.|private|6|19-05-1662|note3=|repealed=n|archived=n|An Act for settling a Capital Messuage, or Mansion-house, with the Appurtenances, in Kensington, in the County of Midd. upon Baptist Viscount Campden and his Heirs.}}

| {{|Confirmation of an Act (12 Cha. 2 c. 9) for Lord Culpeper's restoration.|private|7|19-05-1662|note3=|repealed=n|archived=n|An Act for confirming an Act, for restoring to Thomas Lord Culpeper, Son and Heir and sole Executor of John Lord Culpeper, Baron of Thorsway, and Master of The Rolls, deceased, all his Honours, Manors, Lands, and Tenements, Leases not determined, and Hereditaments whatsoever, whereof the said John Lord Culpeper was in Possession on the 20th Day of May 1642, or at any Time after, which have not been sold or aliened by the said John late Lord Culpeper, by Acts or Assurances to which himself was Party and consenting.}}

| {{|Enabling Bishop of London to lease out tenements built on the site of his palace in London.|private|8|19-05-1662|note3=|repealed=n|archived=n|An Act to enable the Bishop of London to lease out Tenements, now built upon the Site of his Palace in London.}}

| {{|Naturalization of Philadelphia, Lady Wentworth.|private|9|19-05-1662|note3=|repealed=n|archived=n|An Act for the Naturalizing of Philadelphia Wife of the Right Honourable Thomas Lord Wentworth.}}

| {{|Confirmation of several Acts (12 Cha. 2 cc. 6, 15, 20 and 25).|private|10|19-05-1662|note3=|repealed=n|archived=n|An Act for confirming several Acts, therein mentioned.}}

| {{|Confirmation of two Acts (12 Cha. 2 cc. 5 and 14).|private|11|19-05-1662|note3=|repealed=n|archived=n|An Act for confirming of Two Acts, therein mentioned.}}

| {{|Viscount Scudamore's endowment of churches in Ireland.|private|12|19-05-1662|note3=|repealed=n|archived=n|n Act for the Endowment of several Churches, by the Lord Viscount Scudamore, of Sligo, in the Realm of Ireland.}}

| {{|Disuniting the hundreds of Dudston and Kings Barton from the county of the city of Gloucester and restoring them to the county of Gloucester.|private|13|19-05-1662|note3=|repealed=n|archived=n|An Act for the disuniting the Hundreds of Dudston and Kingsbarton from the County of the City of Gloucester, and restoring them to be Part of the County of Gloucester.}}

| {{|Rivers Stour and Salwarpe Navigation (Worcestershire, Staffordshire) Act 1662|private|14|19-05-1662|note3=|repealed=n|archived=n|An Act for making navigable the Rivers of Stower and Salwerp, and the Rivulets and Brooks running into the same, in the Counties of Worcester and Stafford.}}

| {{|Rivers Wye and Lugg navigation (Herefordshire, Gloucestershire, Monmouthshire).|private|15|19-05-1662|note3=|repealed=n|archived=n|An Act for making navigable the Rivers of Wye and Lugg, and the Rivers and Brooks running into the same, in the Counties of Hereford, Gloucester, and Monmouth.}}

| {{|Sir James Enyons' estate: sale of land for payment of debts.|private|16|19-05-1662|note3=|repealed=n|archived=n|}}

| {{|River Ancholm Level (Lincolnshire): confirmation of commissioners' decrees of sewers.|private|17|19-05-1662|note3=|repealed=n|archived=n|An Act for confirming of several Decrees of Sewers, made by the Commissioners of the Limits of the Level of the River of Antholme, in the County of Lyncolne.}}

| {{|Confirmation of decree made for Thomas Derham and the improvements, exchanges and allotments mentioned in it.|private|18|19-05-1662|note3=|repealed=n|archived=n|}}

| {{|Sir Thomas Lee's estate: exchange of lands settled upon marriage of Dame Ann Lee his wife in lieu of other lands.|private|19|19-05-1662|note3=|repealed=n|archived=n|An Act for the enabling Sir Thomas Lee Baronet to exchange some Lands, settled upon the Marriage of Dame Anne Lee his now Wife, in Consideration of another Settlement of Lands of equal Value, in Lieu thereof.}}

| {{|Discharge of manors of Stodscomb and Holwell and other lands in Devon from the trust of 150 years made to Earls of Exeter, Bridgewater and Bolingbrooke.|private|20|19-05-1662|note3=|repealed=n|archived=n|An Act for discharging the Manors of Stodscombe and Hollwell, and other Lands in the County of Devon, from the Trust of One Hundred and Fifty Years, made unto John Earl of Exon, John Earl of Bridgwater, and Oliver Earl of Bolingbrooke.}}

| {{|Rectification of defect in a deed for settling manors and lands on Sir Henry Frederick Thynne.|private|21|19-05-1662|note3=|repealed=n|archived=n|An Act for supplying a supposed Defect of the Words ["stands and be seised"] in a Deed for settling of divers Manors and Lands on Sir Henry Frederick Thynn."}}

| {{|Confirmation of estates of a number of his Majesty's copyhold tenants within the honour of Clitheroe (Lancashire).|private|22|19-05-1662|note3=|repealed=n|archived=n|An Act for confirming the Estates of divers of His Majesty's Copyhold Tenants, within the Honour of Clitheroe, in the County Palatine of Lancaster, according to several Decrees in the Court of Dutchy Chamber of the said County Palatine.}}

| {{|Confirmation of estates of several tenants and copyholders of the manors of Rannes, Irchester, Rushdon and others (Lancashire).|private|23|19-05-1662|note3=|repealed=n|archived=n|An Act for Confirmation of the Estates of divers Tenants and Copyholders of the Manors of Rannes, Irchester, Rushden, and several other Manors, Parcels of the Dutchy of Lancaster.}}

| {{|Piedmont Protestants collection Act (12 Cha. 2 c. 24) confirmation, explanation and enlargement.|private|24|19-05-1662|note3=|repealed=n|archived=n|An Act for confirming, explaining, and enlarging an Act, intituled, An Act for the levying of certain Monies, due upon the Collections for the Protestants of Piedmont.}}

| {{|William Milward's estate: sale of lands for payment of debts.|private|25|07-01-1662|note2=|repealed=n|archived=n|An Act to enable the Sale of some of the Lands of William Milward Esquire, for Payment of some of his Debts.}}

| {{|Sir Robert and William Dallison's estate: sale of lands in Bleesby for payment of debts.|private|26|07-01-1662|note2=|repealed=n|archived=n|An Act vesting certain Lands in Bleasby, in Sir John Mounson the Younger, Robert Thorold Esquire, and Anthony Eyre the Elder, Esquire, and their Heirs, to sell Land, for Payment of the Debts of Sir Robert Dallyson and William Dallyson.}}

| {{|Henry Nevil's estate: sale of lands (Yorkshire and Leicestershire) for payment of his and his son William's debts and confirmation of sales already made.|private|27|07-01-1662|note2=|repealed=n|archived=n|An Act to enable the Trustees of Henry Nevill Esquire to sell certain Manors, Lands, and Tenements, in the Counties of Yorke and Leicester, for Payment of his and his Son William Nevill's Debts; and likewise to confirm and strengthen the Sale of such Lands as they have already sold in the County of Yorke.}}

| {{|Making void certain fines levied by Sir Edward and Dame Mary Powel.|private|28|07-01-1662|note2=|repealed=n|archived=n|An Act for the making void certain Fines unduly procured to be levied, by Sir Edward Powell Knight and Baronet, and Dame Mary his Wife.}}

| {{|Sir Robert Slingsby's estate: sale of lands for payment of debts.|private|29|07-01-1662|note2=|repealed=n|archived=n|An Act for Sale of Sir Robert Slyngsby, deceased, his Land, for Payment of his Debts.}}

| {{|Sir Anthony Brown's estate: sale of lands for payment of debts.|private|30|07-01-1662|note2=|repealed=n|archived=n|An Act for enabling Sir Anthony Browne to sell Lands, for Payment of Debts.}}

| {{|Anthony Etrick's estate: sale of lands for payment of debts.|private|31|07-01-1662|note2=|repealed=n|archived=n|An Act for enabling Anthony Ettrick to sell Lands, for Payment of his Debts.}}

| {{|Naturalization of Anna Ferrers and others.|private|32|07-01-1662|note2=|repealed=n|archived=n|An Act for the Naturalizing of Anna Ferrers, and several other Persons named therein.}}

| {{|Naturalization of Mark le Pla and others.|private|33|07-01-1662|note2=|repealed=n|archived=n|An Act for the Naturalization of Mark Le Pla and others.}}

| {{|Bengeworth Bridge (Worcestershire) Repair Act 1662|private|34|07-01-1662|note2=|repealed=y|archived=n|An Act for the Repairing of Bengworth Bridge.|note4=}}

| {{|Rowland Okeover's estate: sale of lands in Derbyshire.|private|35|07-01-1662|note2=|repealed=n|archived=n|An Act to enable Rowland Okeover Esquire to sell certain Lands, in the County of Derby.}}

| {{|Edward Rivers' estate: sale of lands and houses for payment of debts and provision for younger children.|private|36|07-01-1662|note2=|repealed=n|archived=n|An Act to enable Mistress Clemence Rivers and Mistress Rose Rivers to sell certain Lands and Houses, for Payment of the Debts of Edward Rivers Esquire, deceased, and Provision for his Younger Children.}}

| {{|Thomas Peck's estate: sale of manor and lands in Norfolk for payment of debts.|private|37|07-01-1662|note2=|repealed=n|archived=n|An Act enabling Thomas Peck Esquire to sell a Manor, and some Lands, in the County of Norffolke, for the Payment of his Debts, and other Uses.}}

| {{|Confirmation of agreements between Thomas Bushell and the miners of Rowpits (Somerset) for recovering their drowned and deserted works.|private|38|07-01-1662|note2=|repealed=n|archived=n|An Act for Confirmation of Agreements made between Thomas Bushell Esquire and the Miners of Row-pitts in Somersetshire, for recovering their drowned and deserted Works.}}

| {{|Francis Tindal's estate: sale of land for payment of debts.|private|39|07-01-1662|note2=|repealed=n|archived=n|An Act for the settling certain Lands belonging to Francis Tyndall Gentleman, upon Trustees, to be sold, for the Payment of Debts.}}

| {{|Confirmation of three Acts (12 Cha. 2 cc. 21, 31 and 34).|private|40|07-01-1662|note2=|repealed=n|archived=n|An Act for Confirmation of Three Acts, therein mentioned.}}
}}

1663 (15 Cha. 2)

Second session of the Cavalier Parliament (18 February 1663 – 27 July 1663)

Public Acts

| {{|Destruction of Trees Act 1663|public|2|03-06-1663|note3=|repealed=y|archived=n|An Act for the Punishment of unlawfull cutting or stealing or spoiling of Wood and Underwood and Destroyers of young Timber Trees.}}

| {{|Taxation Act 1663|public|3|27-07-1663|note3=|repealed=y|archived=n|An Act to explaine and supply a former Act for destribution of Threescore thousand Pounds amongst the truely loyall and indigent Commission Officers; and for assessing of Offices, and destributing the moneyes thereby raised for their further supply.}}

| {{|Better Ordering the Forces Act 1663|public|4|27-07-1663|note3=|repealed=y|archived=n|An Additional Act for the better ordering the Forces in the severall Counties of this Kingdome.}}

| {{|Select Vestries Act 1663|public|5|27-07-1663|note3=|repealed=y|archived=n|An Act for regulating Select Vestryes.}}

| {{|Act of Uniformity (Explanation) Act 1663|public|6|27-07-1663|note3=|repealed=y|archived=n|An Act for Releife of such Persons as by Sicknes or other Impediment were disabled from subscribeing the Declaration in the Act of Uniformity and Explanation of part of the said Act.}}

| {{|Encouragement of Trade Act 1663|note1=(also known as the Navigation Act 1663)|public|7|27-07-1663|note3=|repealed=y|archived=n|An Act for the Encouragement of Trade.}}

| {{|Butchers Act 1663|public|8|27-07-1663|note3=|repealed=y|archived=n|An Act to prevent the selling of live fatt Catle by Butchers.}}

| {{|Taxation Act 1663|public|9|27-07-1663|note3=|repealed=y|archived=n|An Act for granting Fower intire Subsidies to His Majestie by the Temporaltie.}}

| {{|Taxation Act 1663|public|10|27-07-1663|note3=|repealed=y|archived=n|An Act for confirming of Fower Subsidyes granted by the Clergy.}}

| {{|Excise Act 1663|public|11|27-07-1663|note3=|repealed=y|archived=n|An Additionall Act for the better ordering and collecting the Duty of Excise and preventing the Abuses therein.}}

| {{|Excise Act 1663|public|12|27-07-1663|note3=|repealed=y|archived=n|An Explanatory Act for Recovery of the Arreares of Excise.}}

| {{|Hearth Money Act 1663|public|13|27-07-1663|note3=|repealed=y|archived=n|An Additionall Act for the better ordering and collecting the Revenue ariseing by Hearth Money.}}

| {{|Settlement on Duke of York Act 1663|public|14|note2=|27-07-1663|note3=|repealed=y|archived=n|An Act for setling the Proffitts of the Post Office and Power of graunting Wyne Lycences on his Royall Highnes the Duke of Yorke and the Heires Males of his Body.}}

| {{|Linen Cloth Act 1663|public|15|27-07-1663|note3=|repealed=y|archived=n|An Act for encourageing the Manufactures of makeing Linen Cloath and Tapistry.}}

| {{|Fisheries, etc. Act 1663|public|16|27-07-1663|note3=|repealed=y|archived=n|An Act for regulateing the Herring and other Fisheries, and for repeale of the Act concerning Madder.}}

| {{|Bedford Level Act 1663|note1=(also known as General Drainage Act 1663)|public|17|note2=|27-07-1663|note3=|repealed=n|archived=n|An Act for settling the dreyning of the Great Levell of the Fenns called Bedford Levell.}}
}}

Private Acts

| {{|Estates of Earl of Kent and Lord Lucas: settling of lands on marriage of the Earl of Kent with the daughter and heir apparent of Lord Lucas.|private|2|27-07-1663|note3=|repealed=n|archived=n|An Act for the settling of the Lands of the Earl of Kent and the Lord Lucas, on the Marriage of the said Earl with the Daughter and Heir Apparent of the Lord Lucas.}}

| {{|Free school in Witney (Oxfordshire): endowment and erection by Henry Box.|private|3|27-07-1663|note3=|repealed=n|archived=n|An Act for settling of a Free School in Witney, in the County of Oxon, being erected and endowed by Henry Box, Citizen and Grocer of London, deceased.}}

| {{|Enabling the Bishop of Winchester to lease out tenements built on the site of his mansion house in St Saviour's parish Southwark (Surrey) and two parks and other desmenses at Bishops Waltham, and other lands, in Hampshire.|private|4|03-06-1663|note3=|repealed=n|archived=n|n Act to enable the Bishop of Winchester to lease out the Tenements now built upon the Site of his Mansion-house, in the Parish of St. Saviour's, in Southwarke, in the County of Surrey, and the Two Parks and other Demesnes at Bishop's Waltham, and other Lands in the County of South'ton.}}

| {{|Repairing and better preserving the quay of the port of Wells (Norfolk).|private|5|27-07-1663|note3=|repealed=y|archived=n|An Act for the repairing and better preserving the Key at the Port of Wells, in the County of Norfolke.|note4= }}

| {{|Governing of St. Oswald's Hospital, Worcestershire.|private|6|27-07-1663|note3=|repealed=n|archived=n|An Act for the governing the Hospital of St. Oswald, in the County of Worcester.}}

| {{|John Robinson's estate: sale of lands for payment of his debts and leasing other lands for provision for his younger children.|private|7|27-07-1663|note3=|repealed=n|archived=n|An Act to enable Sir Francis Boynton Baronet and Richard Robinson Esquire to sell certain Lands of John Robinson Esquire, for Payment of Debts; and leasing of other Lands, for making Provision for his Younger Children.}}

| {{|Making void certain conveyances made by Caril Lord Mollineux.|private|8|27-07-1663|note3=|repealed=n|archived=n|An Act for making void certain Conveyances made by Carryl Lord Mollineux in the late Times.}}

| {{|Bedford Level Act 1663|note1=(also known as General Drainage Act 1663)|private|9|27-07-1663|note3=|repealed=n|archived=n|An Act for settling the dreyning of the Great Levell of the Fenns called Bedford Levell.|note2=}}

| {{|Confirmation of Charles Pitcarne's deed.|private|10|27-07-1663|note3=|repealed=n|archived=n|An Act to confirm a Deed made by Charles Pittcarne Esquire.}}

| {{|Naturalization of Dame Elizabeth Jacob and others.|private|11|27-07-1663|note3=|repealed=n|archived=n|An Act for the Naturalization of Dame Elizabeth Jacob and others.}}

| {{|Naturalization of George Willoughby and others.|private|12|27-07-1663|note3=|repealed=n|archived=n|An Act for the naturalizing of George Willoughby and others}}

| {{|Confirmation of an Act naturalizing Peter and John de la Pierre or Peters.|private|13|27-07-1663|note3=|repealed=n|archived=n|An Act for confirming an Act for naturalizing of Pieter de la Pierre, alias Peters, and John de la Pierre, alias Peters.}}

| {{|Road Repair (Hertfordshire, Cambridgeshire, and Huntingdonshire) Act 1663|private|14|03-06-1663|note3=|repealed=y|archived=n|An Act for repairing the Highwayes within the Countyes of Hertford Cambridge and Huntington.|note2=|note4=}}

| {{|To enable Edward, Marquis of Worcester, to receive the benefit of a water commanding engine invented by him, a tenth part of which is appropriated for the King's Majesty, his heirs and successors.|private|15|03-06-1663|note3=|repealed=n|archived=n|An Act to enable Edward Marquis of Worcester to receive the Benefit and Profit of a Water-commanding Engine by him invented, One Tenth Part whereof is appropriated for the Benefit of the King's Majesty, His Heirs and Successors.}}

| {{|Settlement of an annuity of £300 per year upon Charles Earl of Portland, and for the benefit of Willoughby Whitelocke, Bulstrode Whitelocke and Carleton Whitelocke infants and for confirming agreements made to compose lawsuits against them.|private|16|03-06-1663|note3=|repealed=n|archived=n|An Act for settling an Annuity of Three Hundred Pounds per Annum upon Charles Earl of Portland, and for the Benefit of Willoughby Whitlock, Bulstrode Whitlock, and Carlton Whitlock, Infants; and for confirming of Agreements made to compose Suits in Law against them.}}

| {{|Settling the charitable gift of John Guest.|private|17|03-06-1663|note3=|repealed=n|archived=n|An Act for settling the Charitable Gift of John Guest.}}

| {{|Sir John Packington's estate: sale of land for payment of debts and raising portions for younger children.|private|18|03-06-1663|note3=|repealed=n|archived=n|An Act to enable Sir John Packington and his Trustees to sell, or otherwise dispose of, certain Lands, for the Payment of his Debts, and raising Portions for his Younger Children.}}

| {{|Enabling Edward Chaloner to make provision for his wife Anne and his younger children.|private|19|03-06-1663|note3=|repealed=n|archived=n|An Act to enable Edward Chaloner Esquire to make Provision for Anne his Wife, and his Younger Children.}}

| {{|Naturalization of Charlotte Hessen Killigrew and others.|private|20|03-06-1663|note3=|repealed=n|archived=n|An Act for the naturalizing of Charlottee Hessen Killigrew and others.}}

| {{|Empowering Sir John Drake and others to sell lands for payment of the portion of Ellen Briscoe.|private|21|03-06-1663|note3=|repealed=n|archived=n|An Act to empower Sir John Drake and others to make Sale of Lands, for Payment of the Portion of Ellen Briscoe Widow.}}

| {{|Richard and Anthony Senior's estate: sale of lands for payment of debts.|private|22|03-06-1663|note3=|repealed=n|archived=n|An Act to enable the Sale of some of the Lands of Richard Senior and Anthony Senior, deceased, for Payment of some of their Debts.}}
}}

1664

16 Cha. 2

Third session of the Cavalier Parliament (16 March 1664 – 17 May 1664)

Public Acts

| {{|Error Act 1664|public|2|05-04-1664|repealed=y|archived=n|An Act for preventing of Abatements of Writts of Error upon Judgements in the Exchequer.}}

| {{|Hearth Money Act 1664|public|3|17-05-1664|repealed=y|archived=n|An Act for collecting the Duty ariseing by Hearth-money by Officers to be appointed by His Majestie.}}

| {{|Conventicle Act 1664|public|4|17-05-1664|repealed=y|archived=n|An Act to prevent and suppresse seditious Conventicles}}

| {{|Navy Act 1664|public|5|17-05-1664|repealed=y|archived=n|An Act to prevent the Disturbances of Seamen and others and to preserve the Stores belonging to His Majestyes Navy Royall.}}

| {{|Merchant Ships Act 1664|public|6|17-05-1664|repealed=y|archived=n|An Act to prevent the delivering up of Merchants Shipps.}}

| {{|Gaming Act 1664|public|7|17-05-1664|repealed=y|archived=n|An Act against deceitfull disorderly and excessive Gameing.}}

| {{|Licensing of the Press Act 1664|public|8|17-05-1664|repealed=y|archived=n|An Act for continuance of a former Act for regulateing the Presse.}}
}}

Private Acts

| {{|Sir William Armin's estate: sale of lands and manor of Ingoldesby (Lincolnshire) for raising portions for his two daughters.|private|2|17-05-1664|repealed=n|archived=n|An Act for the Sale of the Manor of Ingoldsby, and divers Lands in Ingoldsby, in the County of Lyncolne, for raising Portions for the Two Daughters and Coheirs of Sir William Armin the Younger, Baronet, deceased.}}
| {{|Sir Sackvile Glemham: sale of lands for payment of debts.|private|3|17-05-1664|repealed=n|archived=n|An Act for the Sale of certain Lands, for Payment of the Debts of Sir Sackvile Glemham.}}
| {{|Sir William Keite's estate: sale of lands for payment of debts.|private|4|17-05-1664|repealed=n|archived=n|An Act to enable Trustees for Sir William Keyte to sell Lands, for the Payment of Debts.}}
| {{|Confirmation of Malvern Chase (Worcestershire) inclosure and improvement.|private|5|17-05-1664|repealed=n|archived=n|An Act for Confirmation of the Enclosure and Improvement of Malverne Chace.}}
| {{|Settling Abraham Colfe's charitable gift for erecting and endowing two free schools and an almshouse at Lewisham (Kent).|private|6|17-05-1664|repealed=n|archived=n|An Act for settling the Charitable Gift of Abraham Colfe Clerk, for erecting and endowing Two Freeschools, and an Alms-house, at Lewisham, in Kent.}}
| {{|Naturalization of Dame Katherine Sayer and others.|private|7|17-05-1664|repealed=n|archived=n|An Act for naturalizing of Dame Katherine Sayer and others.}}
| {{|Enabling Francis or Charles Cottington to settle and dispose of lands to provide jointures for future wives.|private|8|17-05-1664|repealed=n|archived=n|An Act to enable Francis Cottington, or Charles Cottington, to settle and dispose of Lands in Jointure, for any Wife or Wives they shall take in Marriage.}}
| {{|Charles Cotton's estate: leasing of land for payment of debts.|private|9|17-05-1664|repealed=n|archived=n|An Act to enable Charles Cotton Esquire to make Leases of Lands, for Payment of Debts.}}
| {{|Making Falmouth church a parish church.|private|10|17-05-1664|repealed=n|archived=n|An Act for the making of the Church erected at Falmouth a Parish Church, and no Part of the Parish of Gluvias, or Chapelry of St. Budock.}}
}}

16 & 17 Cha. 2

Fourth session of the Cavalier Parliament (24 November 1664 – 2 March 1665)

Public Acts

| {{|Coal Trade, London Act 1664|public|2|02-03-1665|repealed=y|archived=n|An Act for regulateing the Measures and Prices of Coales.}}

| {{|Juries Act 1664|public|3|02-03-1665|repealed=y|archived=n|An Act for the returning of able and sufficient Jurors.}}

| {{|Excise Act 1664|public|4|02-03-1665|repealed=y|archived=n|An Additional Act for the better ordering and collecting the Duty of Excise.}}

| {{|Execution Act 1664|public|5|02-03-1665|repealed=y|archived=n|An Act to prevent Delayes in Extending Statutes Judgements and Recognizances.}}

| {{|Prize Goods Act 1664|public|6|02-03-1665|repealed=y|archived=n|An Act for repealing of part of an Act of Parlyament intituled An Act directing the prosecution of such as are accomptable for Prize Goods.}}

| {{|Licensing of the Press Act 1664|public|7|02-03-1665|repealed=y|archived=n|An Act for continuance of a former Act for regulateing the Presse.}}

| {{|Arrest of Judgment Act 1664|public|8|02-03-1665|repealed=y|archived=n|An Act to prevent Arrests of Judgement and superseding Executions.}}

| {{|Lancaster (Affidavits) Act 1664|public|9|02-03-1665|repealed=y|archived=n|An Act to impower the Chauncellour of the Dutchy to grant Commissions for takeing Affidavits within the Dutchy Liberty.}}

| {{|Highways (Hertford) Act 1664|public|10|02-03-1665|repealed=y|archived=n|An Act for continuance of a former Act for repairing the Highwayes within the County of Hertford.|note2=}}

| {{|Draining Deeping Fen Act 1664|public|11|02-03-1665|repealed=n|archived=n|An Act for drayning of the Fenn called Deeping Fenn and other Fenns therin mentioned.|note2=}}

| {{|River Avon Navigation (Christchurch to New Sarum) Act 1664|public|12|02-03-1665|repealed=n|archived=n|An Act for making the River Avon navigable from Christ Church to the City of New Sarum.|note2=}}
}}

Private Acts

| {{|Samuel Sandys' estate: sale of lands for payment of debts.|private|2|09-02-1665|repealed=n|archived=n|An Act for the enabling of Trustees to sell Part of the Estate of Samuell Sandys the Elder Esquire, and of his Son Samuell Sandys, for the Payment of Debts.}}

| {{|Confirmation of a deed of settlement between the Earl of Thanet and his younger brothers.|private|3|02-03-1665|repealed=n|archived=n|An Act for confirming a Deed of Settlement between the Earl of Thannett and his Younger Brothers.}}

| {{|Enabling the Bishop of Winchester to convey 100 acres of land in the disparked Park of Bishops Waltham (Hampshire) to the rector of Bishops Waltham parish church and his successors in lieu of all tithes and tithe payments due to them for Waltham Parks.|private|4|02-03-1665|repealed=n|archived=n|An Act to enable the Bishop of Winton to convey One Hundred Acres of Land, lying in the Great Disparked Park of Bishops Waltham, in the Parish of Bishops Waltham, in the County of South'ton, upon the Rector of the said Parish Church of Bishops Waltham and his Successors, in Lieu of all Tithes, and Payments for Tithes, due to the said Rector and his Successors for Waltham Parks.}}

| {{|Lord Henry Powlet, George Withers and John Mompesson: power to sell manor of Abbots-Anne (Hampshire).|private|5|02-03-1665|repealed=n|archived=n|An Act to enable the Lord Henry Powlett, George Withers, and John Mompcsson, to sell the Manor of Abbotts Anne, in the County of Southampton.}}

| {{|Enabling Henry Lord Loughborough to make the river and sewer navigable from or near Bristow Causey (Lambeth) into the River Thames.|private|6|02-03-1665|repealed=n|archived=n|An Act to enable Henry Lord Loughborough to make the River and Sewer navigable, from or near Bristowe Causey, in the County of Surrey, into the River of Thames.}}

| {{|Lord Strangford's estate: sale of lands for payment of debts.|private|7|02-03-1665|repealed=n|archived=n|An Act to enable Trustees for the Lord Strangford to sell Lands, for Payment of Debts.}}

| {{|Restitution in blood of Sir Charles Stanley.|private|8|02-03-1665|repealed=n|archived=n|An Act for restoring Sir Charles Stanley in Blood.}}

| {{|Sir Jacob Astley's estate: settling of lands and manors in Norfolk or Warwickshire.|private|9|02-03-1665|repealed=n|archived=n|An Act for the settling of several Manors, Lands, and Tenements of Sir Jacob Astley, lying in the Counties of Norfolke and Warwicke.}}

| {{|Settling Sir Robert Carr's estate.|private|10|02-03-1665|repealed=n|archived=n|An Act for settling the Estate of Sir Robert Carr Baronet.}}

| {{|River Medway (Kent and Sussex) Navigation Act 1664|private|12|02-03-1665|repealed=n|archived=n|An Act for making the River of Medway navigable, in the Counties of Kent and Sussex.}}

| {{|River Avon Navigation (Christchurch to New Sarum) Act 1664|private|11|02-03-1665|repealed=n|archived=n|An Act for making the River Avon navigable from Christ Church to the City of New Sarum.|note2=}}

| {{|Rivers (various) navigation.|private|13|02-03-1665|repealed=n|archived=n|An Act for making divers Rivers navigable, or otherwise passable, for Boats, Barges, and other Vessels.}}

| {{|For settling differences between Great and Little Yarmouth concerning the loading and unloading of herrings and other goods.|private|14|02-03-1665|repealed=n|archived=n|An Act for settling of Differences between the Towns of Great and Little Yarmouth, touching the Lading and Unlading of Herrings, and other Merchandizes and Commodities.}}

| {{|Naturalization of Richard Comes and others.|private|15|02-03-1665|repealed=n|archived=n|An Act for the naturalizing Dederic alias Richard Comes, and others.}}

| {{|Confirmation of an Act concerning Joseph Micklethwaite's estate (12 Cha. 2 c. 30).|private|16|02-03-1665|repealed=n|archived=n|An Act for confirming of an Act, intituled, An Act to enable Joseph Micklethwaite, an Infant, and his Trustees, to sell Land, for Payment of his Father's Debts.}}

| {{|Thomas Iuckes of Trelidden's (Montgomeryshire) estate: sale of land for payment of debts and raising younger children's portions.|private|17|02-03-1665|repealed=n|archived=n|An Act for the enabling of Thomas Juckes, of Treliddan, in the County of Mountgomery, Esquire, to sell Lands, for the Payment of his Debts, and raising of Younger Childrens Portions.}}

| {{|Francis Lee's estate: sale of lands for payment of debts and making provision for children.|private|18|02-03-1665|repealed=n|archived=n|An Act to enable Francis Leigh Esquire to sell Lands, for Payment of Debts, and to make Provision for his Children."
}}

| {{|Highways (Hertford) Act 1664|private|19|02-03-1665|repealed=y|archived=n|An Act for continuance of a former Act for repairing the Highwayes within the County of Hertford.|note2=}}

| {{|Draining Deeping Fen Act 1664|private|20|02-03-1665|repealed=n|archived=n|An Act for drayning of the Fenn called Deeping Fenn and other Fenns therin mentioned.|note2=}}
}}

1665 (17 Cha. 2)

Fifth session of the Cavalier Parliament (9 October 1665 – 31 October 1665) (held at Oxford)

Public Acts

| {{|Nonconformists Act 1665|note1=(also known as the "Five Mile Act")|public|2|31-10-1665|repealed=y|archived=n|An Act for restraining Non-Conformists from inhabiting in Corporations.}}

| {{|Augmentation of Benefices Act 1665|public|3|31-10-1665|repealed=y|archived=n|An Act for uniting Churches in Cittyes and Townes Corporate.}}

| {{|Licensing of the Press Act 1665|public|4|31-10-1665|repealed=y|archived=n|An Act for continuance of a former Act for regulateing the Presse.}}

| {{|Attainder of Certain Persons Act 1665|public|5|31-10-1665|repealed=y|archived=n|An Act for attainting Thomas Dolman Joseph Bampfield and Thomas Scott of High-Treason if they render not themselves by a day.}}

| {{|Damage Cleer Act 1665|public|6|31-10-1665|repealed=y|archived=n|An Act for takeing away of Damage Cleere.}}

| {{|Distresses and Avowries for Rents Act 1665|public|7|31-10-1665|repealed=y|archived=n|An Act for a more speedy and effectuall Proceeding upon Distresses and Avowryes for Rents.}}

| {{|Death between Verdict and Judgment Act 1665|public|8|31-10-1665|repealed=y|archived=n|An Act for avoiding unnecessary Suites and Delayes.}}

| {{|Taxation Act 1665|public|9|31-10-1665|repealed=y|archived=n|An Act for granting One Months Assessment to His Majestie.}}
}}

Private Acts

}}

1666–67 (18 & 19 Cha. 2)

cc. 1–5 are from the sixth session of the Cavalier Parliament (21 September 1666 – 8 February 1667)
cc. 6–13 are from the seventh session of the Cavalier Parliament (10 October 1667 – 19 December 1667)

Label given as "18 & 19 Car. 2" (18 & 19 Cha. 2) in Statutes of the Realm, and separately as "18 Car. 2" (18 Cha. 2) and "19 Car. 2" (19 Cha. 2) in Ruffhead-Pickering Statutes at Large.  Equivalences: 18 & 19 Cha. 2 (cc. 1–5) = 18 Cha. 2 (cc. 1–5); 18 & 19 Cha. 2 (cc. 6–13) = 19 Cha. 2 (1–8).

Public Acts

| {{|Importation Act 1666|public|2|18-01-1667|repealed=y|archived=n|An Act against importing Cattell from Ireland and other parts beyond the Seas and Fish taken by Forreigners.}}

| {{|Moss Troopers Act 1666|public|3|18-01-1667|repealed=y|archived=n|An Act to continue a former Act for preventing of Thefte and Rapine upon the Northerne Borders of England.}}

| {{|Burying in Wool Act 1666|public|4|18-01-1667|repealed=y|archived=n|An Act for Burying in Woollen onely.}}

| {{|Coin Act 1666|public|5|18-01-1667|repealed=y|archived=n|An Act for encourageing of Coynage.}}

| {{|Taxation Act 1666|public|6|08-02-1667|note3=|repealed=y|archived=n|An Act Explanatory of the Act for raiseing Moneyes by a Poll and otherwise towards the Maintenance of this present Warr.}}

| {{|Fire of London Disputes Act 1666|public|7|08-02-1667|note3=|repealed=y|archived=n|An Act for erecting a Judicature for Determination of Differences touching Houses burned or demolished by reason of the late Fire which happened in London.}}

| {{|Rebuilding of London Act 1666|public|8|08-02-1667|note3=|repealed=y|archived=n|An Act for rebuilding the Citty of London.}}

| {{|Poor Prisoners Act 1666|public|9|08-02-1667|note3=|repealed=y|archived=n|An Act for reliefe of Poore Prisoners and setting of them on worke.}}

| {{|Replevins in Wales and Counties Palatine Act 1666|public|10|08-02-1667|note3=|repealed=y|archived=n|An Act extending a former Act concerning Replevins and Avowries to the Principallity of Wales and the County Palatines.}}

| {{|Cestui que Vie Act 1666|public|11|08-02-1667|note3=|repealed=n|archived=n|An Act for Redresse of Inconveniencies by want of Proofe of the Deceases of Persons beyond the Seas or absenting themselves, upon whose Lives Estates doe depend.}}

| {{|Navy Act 1666|public|12|08-02-1667|note3=|repealed=y|archived=n|An Act to prevent the Disturbances of Seamen and others and to preserve the Stores belonging to His Majesties Navy Royall.}}

| {{|Taxation Act 1666|public|13|08-02-1667|note3=|repealed=y|archived=n|An Act for granting the Summe of Twelve hundred fifty six thousand three hundred forty seaven pounds thirteene shillings to the Kings Majestie towards the Maintenance of the present Warr.}}
}}

Private Acts

| {{|Naturalization of Lady Isabella Arlington Act 1666|private|2|18-01-1667|repealed=n|archived=n|An Act for naturalizing of Isabella of Nassaw, Wife of the Right Honourable the Lord Arlington, One of His Majesty's Principal Secretaries of State.}}

| {{|Lady Elizabeth Noell's jointure.|private|3|18-01-1667|repealed=n|archived=n|An Act for Supply of Part of the Jointure of the Lady Elizabeth Noel.}}

| {{|Settling John Bodnell's estate.|private|4|18-01-1667|repealed=n|archived=n|An Act for settling the Estate of John Bodvell Esquire, deceased.}}

| {{|Lord Strangford's estate: additional Act for sale of lands for payment of debts.|private|5|18-01-1667|repealed=n|archived=n|An additional Act for enabling a Sale of Lands, to pay the Lord Strangford's Debts.}}

| {{|Naturalization of Hesther Le Lou.|private|6|08-02-1667|note3=|repealed=n|archived=n|An Act for the naturalizing of Esther Le Lou, the Daughter and Coheir of Gideon Le Lou, Lord of Colombiers in Normandy, the now Wife of the Right Honourable Denzell Lord Holles, of Ifeild.}}

| {{|Confirming, explaining and enlarging an Act concerning Lord Abergavenny's estate.|private|7|08-02-1667|note3=|repealed=n|archived=n|An Act for confirming, explaining, and enlarging, an Act, intituled, An Act to enable John Lord Abergaveny, Son and Heir of Henry late Lord Abergaveny, to sell certain Lands, for Payment of his Debts, and Preferment of his Brother and Sisters.}}

| {{|Illegitimation of Lady Anne Roos' Children Act 1666|private|8|08-02-1667|note3=|repealed=n|archived=n|An Act for the Illegitimation of the Children of the Lady Anne Roos.}}

| {{|Edward Russell's estate: sale of a messuage in Chiswick for payment of debts.|private|9|08-02-1667|note3=|repealed=n|archived=n|An Act for Sale of a Messuage in Chiswich, for Payment of the Debts of Edward Russell Esquire.}}

| {{|Sir Seymour Shirley's estate: confirmation of a settlement.|private|10|08-02-1667|note3=|repealed=n|archived=n|An Act for Confirmation of a Settlement of the Estate of Sir Seymour Shirley Baronet.}}

| {{|Settling moiety of manor of Iron Acton on Sir John Pointz.|private|11|08-02-1667|repealed=n|archived=n|An Act for settling the Moiety of the Manor of Iron Acton on Sir John Poyntz.}}

| {{|Settling an estate in trust for benefit of Mrs Pride and her children.|private|12|08-02-1667|note3=|repealed=n|archived=n|An Act for settling an Estate in Trust for the Benefit of Mrs. Elizabeth Pride and her Children.}}

| {{|Uniting Churches (Swafham Prior, Cambridgeshire) Act 1666|private|13|08-02-1667|note3=|repealed=n|archived=n|An Act for the ascertaining the Bounds of the several Rectories of Swaffham St. Cyriac and of Sawffham St. Marie's, within the Town of Swaffham Prior, in the County of Cambridge, and for the uniting of the Two Churches there.}}

| {{|Restitution in blood of Francis Scawen.|private|14|08-02-1667|note3=|repealed=n|archived=n|An Act for the restoring of Francis Scawen Gentleman in Blood.}}

| {{|Naturalization of Dame Mary Frazer and others.|private|15|08-02-1667|note3=|repealed=n|archived=n|An Act for naturalizing Dame Mary Frazer and others.}}

| {{|Henry Kendall's estate: sale of lands for payment of debts.|private|16|08-02-1667|note3=|repealed=n|archived=n|An Act to enable a Sale of Lands, for Payment of the Debts of Henry Kendall Esquire.}}

| {{|Henry Mildmay's estate: settling lands for payment of debts and provision for children.|private|17|08-02-1667|note3=|repealed=n|archived=n|An Act for selling Part of the Lands of Henry Mildmay Esquire deceased, for Payment of his Debts, and making Provision for his Children.}}

| {{|Leicester Grosvenor's estate: sale of lands for payment of debts.|private|18|08-02-1667|note3=|repealed=n|archived=n|An Act to enable Leicester Grosevenor and his Trustees to sell certain Lands, for Payment of Debts.}}
}}

1667–68 (19 & 20 Cha. 2)

cc. 1–5 are from Seventh session of the Cavalier Parliament (10 October 1667 – 19 December 1667)
cc. 6–13 are from Seventh session (continued) of Cavalier Parliament (10 February 1668 – 9 May 1668)

Label given as "19 & 20 Car. 2" (19 & 20 Cha. 2) in Statutes of the Realm, but separately as "19 Car. 2" (19 Cha. 2) and "20 Car. 2" (20 Cha. 2) in Ruffhead-Pickering Statutes at Large.  Equivalences: 19 & 20 Cha. 2 (cc. 1–5) = 19 Cha. 2 (cc. 9–13); 19 & 20 Cha. 2 (cc. 6–13) = 20 Cha. 2 (cc. 1–8).

Public Acts

| {{|Earl of Clarendon Act 1667|public|2|19-12-1667|repealed=y|archived=n|An Act for banishing and disenabling the Earl of Clarendon.}}

| {{|Prize Ships Act 1667|public|3|19-12-1667|repealed=y|archived=n|An Act to make Prize Ships free for Trade.}}

| {{|Exchequer Orders Act 1667|public|4|19-12-1667|repealed=y|archived=n|An Act for assigning Orders in the Exchequer without Revocation.}}

| {{|Trade Act 1667|public|5|19-12-1667|repealed=y|archived=n|An Act for setling Freedome and Intercourse of Trade between England and Scotland.}}

| {{|Taxation Act 1667|public|6|09-05-1668|repealed=y|archived=n|An Act for raising Three hundred and ten thousand pounds by an Imposition on Wines and other Liquors.}}

| {{|Public Accountants Act 1667|public|7|09-05-1668|repealed=y|archived=n|An Act for the better Payment of Moneys received for the Use of the Crown.}}

| {{|Dean Forest Act 1667|public|8|09-05-1668|repealed=y|archived=n|An Act for the Increase and preservation of Timber within the Forest of Deane.}}

| {{|Error Act 1667|public|9|09-05-1668|repealed=y|archived=n|An Act for proceeding to Judgement on Writs of Error brought in the Exchequer.}}

| {{|Exportation Act 1667|public|10|09-05-1668|repealed=y|archived=n|An Act for giving Liberty to buy and export Leather and Skins tanned or dressed.}}

| {{|Silk Throwing Act 1667|public|11|09-05-1668|repealed=y|archived=n|An Act to regulate the Trade of Silk Throwing.}}

| {{|Importation Act 1667|public|12|09-05-1668|repealed=y|archived=n|An Additional Act against the Importation of Forreign Cattel.}}

| {{|Bedford Level Act 1667|public|13|09-05-1668|repealed=y|archived=n|An Act for the taxing and assessing of the Lands of the Adventurers within the Great Levell of the Fenns.|note2=}}
}}

Private Acts

| {{|Enabling Bishop of Durham to lease certain lead mines for three lives.|private|2|19-12-1667|repealed=n|archived=n|An Act to enable John Lord Bishop of Durham, and his Successors, to make Leases for Three Lives of certain Lead Mines.}}

| {{|Confirmation of an exchange of lands between Horatio Lord Townsend and the Rector of East and West Raynham (Norfolk).|private|3|19-12-1667|repealed=n|archived=n|An Act for Confirmation of an Exchange of certain Lands, between Horatio Lord Townsend and the Rector of East and West Reynham, in the County of Norfolke.}}

| {{|Naturalization of Alvaro de Costa and others.|private|4|19-12-1667|repealed=n|archived=n|An Act for the Naturalization of Alvaro da Costa and others.}}

| {{|Settling of lands on Sir Richard Wiseman and John Plott for better performance of a trust.|private|5|19-12-1667|repealed=n|archived=n|An Act for settling the Lands therein mentioned upon Sir Richard Wiseman and John Plott, and their Heirs, to enable them the better to perform a Trust.}}

| {{|Exchange of lands and manors of William Palmes for other lands settled upon him and his issue by his wife Mary.|private|6|19-12-1667|repealed=n|archived=n|An Act for exchanging certain Manors and Lands of William Palmes Esquire, for other Lands settled upon him and his Issue by Mary his Wife.}}

| {{|Fire of London: indemnification of City Sheriffs and Warden of the Fleet for the escape of prisoners and other matters occasioned by the fire.|private|7|09-05-1668|repealed=n|archived=n|An Act to indemnify the late Sheriffs of the City of London, and the Warden of The Fleete, touching the Escapes of Prisoners, and other Matters occasioned by the late Fire.}}

| {{|Bedford Level Act 1667|private|8|09-05-1668|repealed=y|archived=n|An Act for the taxing and assessing of the Lands of the Adventurers within the Great Level of the Fens.|note2=}}

| {{|Sir Thomas Leventhorp's estate: settlement of manors and lands in Essex and Hertfordshire.|private|9|09-05-1668|repealed=n|archived=n|An Act for settling of certain Manors, Lands, and Tenements, of Sir Thomas Leventhorpe Baronet, in the Counties of Essex and Hertford.}}

| {{|Sir Thomas Heblethwaite's estate: sale of lands for payment of debts and provision for younger children.|private|10|09-05-1668|repealed=n|archived=n|An Act to enable Sir Thomas Hebblethwayte to sell or dispose of Lands, to pay Debts, and make Provision for Younger Children.}}

| {{|Lucy estates: confirmation of the settlement of Sir Kingsmill Lucy and transfer of part of the real estate of Sir Richard Lucy from Francis Lucy.|private|11|09-05-1668|repealed=n|archived=n|An Act for Confirmation of the Settlement of the Estate of Sir Kingsmill Lucy Baronet, in the said Act mentioned; and for transferring over some Parts of the Real Estate of Sir Richard Lucy Knight and Baronet, deceased, from Francis Lucy Esquire.}}

| {{|Horton inclosure and preservation of wood and timber: confirmation of an agreement between lord of manor and tenants.|private|12|09-05-1668|repealed=n|archived=n|An Act to confirm an Agreement between William Paston Esquire, Lord of the Manor of Horton, and the Tenants of the said Manor, for an Enclosure of Part of the Wastes of the said Manor, for the Preservation and Growth of Wood and Timber.}}

| {{|Enabling Sir William Juxon to recover part of the estate of William Juxon late Archbishop of Canterbury.|private|13|09-05-1668|repealed=n|archived=n|An Act for enabling of Sir William Juxon Knight and Baronet, Executor of the last Will and Testament of William Juxon late Lord Archbishop of Canterbury, to recover Part of his Estate.}}

| {{|Better securing Lady Frances Savile's portion of £5000 out of part of James Earl of Sussex's estate pursuant to her father's, Thomas Earl of Sussex's, will.|private|14|09-05-1668|repealed=n|archived=n|An Act for the better securing a Portion of Five Thousand Pounds to and for the Lady Francis Savile, and Infant, Daughter of Thomas late Earl of Sussex, deceased, out of Part of the Estate of James Earl of Sussex, also an Infant, in Pursuance of the Will of the said Thomas Earl of Sussex.}}

| {{|Dawes Wimondseld's estate: sale of customary lands held of the manor of Wimbledon (Surrey).|private|15|09-05-1668|repealed=n|archived=n|An Act on the Behalf of Dawes Wymondsall Esquire, for settling certain Customary Lands, held of the Manor of Wimbleton, in the County of Surrey.}}

| {{|Execution of Richard Tayler's trust for payment of debts and provision for younger children.|private|16|09-05-1668|repealed=n|archived=n|An Act for enabling the Execution of a Trust, for Payment of the Debts, and providing for the Younger Children, of Richard Taylor Esquire, deceased.}}

| {{|Sir Charles Stanley's estate: leasing of land for payment of debts and provision for children.|private|17|09-05-1668|repealed=n|archived=n|An Act for enabling Trustees to make Leases, for Payment of the Debts, and providing for the Children, of Sir Charles Stanley.}}
}}

1670–1679

1670

22 Cha. 2

Ninth session of the Cavalier Parliament (14 February 1670 – 11 April 1670). The Eighth Session, October–December 1669, did not pass any public acts.

Public Acts

| {{|Yarmouth Haven and Pier Repairs (Duties) Act 1670|public|2|14-02-1670|note3=|repealed=y|archived=n|An Act for repaireing of the Haven and Peers of Great Yarmouth.}}

| {{|Taxation (Wines and Vinegar) Act 1670|public|3|14-02-1670|note3=|repealed=y|archived=n|An Act for granting unto his Majestie an Imposition upon all Wines and Vinegar imported betweene...June One thousand six hundred seaventy and...June One thousand six hundred seaventy eight.}}

| {{|Taxation (Brandy) Act 1670|public|4|14-02-1670|note3=|repealed=y|archived=n|An Act for setleing the Imposition on Brandy.}}

| {{|Benefit of Clergy Act 1670|public|5|14-02-1670|note3=|repealed=y|archived=n|An Act for takeing away the Benefit of Clergy from such as steale Cloth from the Racke and from such as shall steale or imbezill his Majestyes Ammunition and Stores.}}

| {{|Duchy of Cornwall Act 1670|public|6|14-02-1670|note3=|repealed=y|archived=n|An Act for advanceing the Sale of Fee-Farme Rents and other Rents.}}

| {{|Duchy of Cornwall Act 1670|public|7|14-02-1670|note3=|repealed=y|archived=n|An Act to enable the Kings Majestie to make Leases, Grants and Copyes of Offices, Lands Tenements and Hereditaments Parcell of his Highnesse Dutchy of Cornwall, or annexed to the same.}}

| {{|Measures Act 1670|public|8|14-02-1670|note3=|repealed=y|archived=n|An Act for ascertaining the Measures of Corne and Salt.}}

| {{|Union between England and Scotland Act 1670|public|9|14-02-1670|note3=|repealed=y|archived=n|An Act authorizing certaine Commissioners of the Realme of England to treate with Commissioners of Scotland for the Weale of both Kingdomes.}}

| {{|Sale of Sir John Prittiman's Lands Act 1670|public|10|14-02-1670|note3=|repealed=y|archived=n|An Act for sale of part of the Estate of Sir John Prittiman for satisfaction of a Debt by him due to the Kings Majestie.}}

| {{|Rebuilding of London Act 1670|public|11|14-02-1670|note3=|repealed=y|archived=n|Act for the rebuilding of the City of London, uniting of Parishes and rebuilding of the Cathedral and Parochial Churches within the said City.}}

| {{|Bridges Act 1670|public|12|14-02-1670|note3=|repealed=y|archived=n|An Additionall Act for the better repairing of Highwayes and Bridges.}}

| {{|Tillage Act 1670|public|13|14-02-1670|note3=|repealed=y|archived=n|An Act for Improvement of Tillage and the Breede of Catle.}}

}}

Private Acts

| {{|Settlement of Bishop of Rochester's charities.|private|2|14-02-1670|note3=|repealed=n|archived=n|}}

| {{|Enabling Anthony Ashley to acknowledge fines and suffer recoveries of lands while he is under 21 years old.|private|3|14-02-1670|note3=|repealed=n|archived=n|}}

| {{|Settling part of Dame Susan Bellasis' estate.|private|4|14-02-1670|note3=|repealed=n|archived=n|}}

| {{|Confirmation of purchasers' estates and settling differences between Lady Elizabeth Lee and the daughters and coheirs of Earl of Downe.|private|5|14-02-1670|note3=|repealed=n|archived=n|}}

| {{|Viscount Strangford's estate: sale of lands for payment of debts.|private|6|14-02-1670|note3=|repealed=n|archived=n|}}

| {{|Enabling Sir William Gostwicke to make a jointure for his wife Dame Mary.|private|7|14-02-1670|note3=|repealed=n|archived=n|}}

| {{|Confirmation of Sir Ralph Bankes' estate (manor of Thesbestet and other lands in the county and county and borough of Carmarthen).|private|8|14-02-1670|note3=|repealed=n|archived=n|}}

| {{|Sir Cuthbert Heron's estate: sale of land for payment of debts and raising of portions for younger children.|private|9|14-02-1670|note3=|repealed=n|archived=n|}}

| {{|Dorothy Farewell's estate: sale of lands for payment of debts.|private|10|14-02-1670|note3=|repealed=n|archived=n|}}

| {{|Sale of manor of Firbeck (Yorkshire) and other lands for payment of debts.|private|11|14-02-1670|note3=|repealed=n|archived=n|}}

| {{|Building a mansion house for the dean of St. Paul's Church, London.|private|12|14-02-1670|note3=|repealed=n|archived=n|}}

| {{|Disposing of a house and lands belonging to sisters and coheirs of Margaret Strode.|private|13|14-02-1670|note3=|repealed=n|archived=n|}}

| {{|Shadwell: endowment of a church and making it a parish church distinct from Stepney (Middlesex).|private|14|14-02-1670|note3=|repealed=n|archived=n|}}

| {{|Deeping Fens drainage (Lincolnshire).|private|15|14-02-1670|note3=|repealed=n|archived=n|}}

| {{|Rivers Brandon and Waveney (Norfolk, Suffolk) navigation.|private|16|14-02-1670|note3=|repealed=n|archived=n|}}

| {{|Thomas Hord's estate: power to grant leases.|private|17|14-02-1670|note3=|repealed=n|archived=n|}}

| {{|Richard Beckham's estate: sale of lands to pay father's debts and to raise portions for younger brothers.|private|18|14-02-1670|note3=|repealed=n|archived=n|}}

| {{|John Bill's estate: sale of lands in Kent and Surrey.|private|19|14-02-1670|note3=|repealed=n|archived=n|}}

| {{|Thomas Leigh's estate: sale of lands for payment of debts.|private|20|14-02-1670|note3=|repealed=n|archived=n|}}

| {{|Robert Hotchkin's estate: sale of land for payment of debts and raising portions for daughters.|private|21|14-02-1670|note3=|repealed=n|archived=n|}}

| {{|Assurance of lands in County Durham to Doctor Wharton by Henry and Jane Perkins.|private|22|14-02-1670|note3=|repealed=n|archived=n|}}

| {{|Thomas Davison's estate: sale of lands for payment of debts and provision for younger children.|private|23|14-02-1670|note3=|repealed=n|archived=n|}}

| {{|Naturalization of Captain Christopher Gunman and others.|private|24|14-02-1670|note3=|repealed=n|archived=n|}}

| {{|Naturalization of Horatio Woodhouse and others.|private|25|14-02-1670|note3=|repealed=n|archived=n|}}
}}

22 & 23 Cha. 2

Ninth session (continued) of the Cavalier Parliament (24 October 1670 – 22 April 1671)

Public Acts

| {{|Extents Act 1670|public|2|06-03-1671|note3=|repealed=y|archived=n|An Act for Continuance of a former Actt entituled "An Act to prevent Delayes in extending Statutes Judgements and Recognizances."}}

| {{|Subsidy Act 1670|public|3|06-03-1671|note3=|repealed=y|archived=n|An Act for granting a Subsidy to his Majestie for Supply of his Extraordinary Occasions.}}

| {{|Judgments, etc. Act 1670|public|4|06-03-1671|note3=|repealed=y|archived=n|An Act for continuance of a former Act to prevent Arrests of Judgements and superseding Executions.}}

| {{|Excise Act 1670|public|5|06-03-1671|note3=|repealed=y|archived=n|An Act for an Additionall Excise upon Beere, Ale and other Liquors.}}

| {{|Wine Licences, etc. Act 1670|public|6|06-03-1671|note3=|repealed=y|archived=n|An Act for revesting the Power of granting Wine Licences in his Majesty his Heires and Successors and for; setleing a Recompence on his Royall Highnesse in liew thereof.}}

| {{|Burning of Houses, etc. Act 1670|public|7|06-03-1671|note3=|repealed=y|archived=n|An Act to prevent the malitious burning of Houses, Stackes of Corne and Hay and killing or maiming of Catle.}}

| {{|Kidderminster Stuffs Act 1670|public|8|06-03-1671|note3=|repealed=y|archived=n|An Act for the regulateing the makeing of Kidderminster Stuffes.}}

| {{|Duties on Law Proceedings Act 1670|public|9|06-03-1671|note3=|repealed=y|archived=n|An Act for laying Impositions on Proceedings at Law.}}

| {{|Statute of Distribution|public|10|06-03-1671|note3=|repealed=y|archived=n|An Act for the better setling of Intestates Estates.}}

| {{|Piracy Act 1670|public|11|06-03-1671|note3=|repealed=y|archived=n|An Act to prevent the delivery up of Merchants Shipps, and for the Increase of good and serviceable shipping.}}

| {{|Measures Act 1670|public|12|06-03-1671|note3=|repealed=y|archived=n|An Additionall Act for ascertaining the Measures of Corne and Salt.}}

| {{|Exportation Act 1670|public|13|06-03-1671|note3=|repealed=y|archived=n|An Act for exporting of Beere Ale and Mum.}}

| {{|Rebuilding of London (Disputes) Act 1670|public|14|06-03-1671|note3=|repealed=y|archived=n|An Act for determination of Differences touching Houses burnt or demolished within fower yeares since the late dreadfull Fire of London}}

| {{|Tithes in London After the Fire Act 1670|public|15|06-03-1671|note3=|repealed=y|archived=n|An Act for the better Setlement of the Maintenance of the Parsons Vicars and Curates in the Parishes of the Citty of London burnt by the late dreadfull Fire there.}}

| {{|Plague and Fire Relief Funds (Frauds, etc.) Act 1670|public|16|06-03-1671|note3=|repealed=y|archived=n|An Act for the discovery of such as have defrauded the Poore of the Citty of London, of the Moneys given for their Releife at the times of the late Plague and Fire, and for recovery of the Arreares thereof.}}

| {{|London Streets, Paving, Cleansing, etc. Act 1670|public|17|06-03-1671|note3=|repealed=y|archived=n|An Act for the better paveing and cleansing the Streets and Sewers in and about the Citty of London.}}

| {{|Poor Act 1670|public|18|06-03-1671|note3=|repealed=y|archived=n|An Act for the better regulateing of Workehouses for setting the Poore on Worke.}}

| {{|Sale of Cattle Act 1670|public|19|06-03-1671|note3=|repealed=y|archived=n|An Act to prevent Fraudes in the buying and selling of Cattell in Smithfeild and elsewhere.}}

| {{|Insolvent Debtors Relief Act 1670|public|20|06-03-1671|note3=|repealed=y|archived=n|An Act for the Releife and Release of poore distressed Prisoners for Debt.}}

| {{|22 & 23 Cha. 2. c. 21|public|21|06-03-1671|note3=|repealed=y|archived=n|An Act for takeing the Accompts of Sixty thousand pounds and other Moneys given to the loyall and indigent Officers.}}

| {{|Fines and Forfeitures Act 1670|public|22|06-03-1671|note3=|repealed=y|archived=n|An Act for the better and more certaine Recovery of Fines and Forfeitures due to his Majestie.}}

| {{|Navy Act 1670|public|23|06-03-1671|note3=|repealed=y|archived=n|An Act to revive an Act, Entituled An Act to prevent the disturbances of Seamen and others, and to preserve the Stores belonging to his Majestyes Navy Royall, with some Alterations and Additions.}}

| {{|Fee Farm Rents Act 1670|public|24|06-03-1671|note3=|repealed=y|archived=n|An Act for vesting certaine Fee-Farme Rents and other small Rents in Trustees.}}

| {{|Game Act 1670|public|25|06-03-1671|note3=|repealed=y|archived=n|An Act for the better preservation of the Game, and for secureing Warrens not inclosed, and the severall Fishings of this Realme.}}

| {{|Tobacco Planting and Plantation Trade Act 1670|public|26|06-03-1671|note3=|repealed=y|archived=n|An Act to prevent the planting of Tobacco in England, and for regulateing the Plantation Trade.}}

| {{|Post Office Revenues Act 1670|public|27|note2=|06-03-1671|note3=|repealed=y|archived=n|An Act for explaining of a Proviso conteyned in an Act, entituled "An Act for settling the Profitts of ye Post-Office and Power of granteing Wine-Licences on His Royall Highnes ye Duke of Yorke and the Heyres Males of his Body."}}
}}

Private Acts

| {{|Enabling guardians to dispose of lands for benefit of Charles Earl of Shrewsbury and John Talbot (infants).|private|2|06-03-1671|note3=|repealed=n|archived=n|}}

| {{|Confirmation of agreements between Lord and Lady Stafford and their customary tenants and copyholders.|private|3|06-03-1671|note3=|repealed=n|archived=n|}}

| {{|James Lord Norreys' estate: enabling conveyancing during his minority.|private|4|06-03-1671|note3=|repealed=n|archived=n|}}

| {{|Enabling the Bishops of Bangor and St. Asaph to lease their lead mines for 21 years.|private|5|06-03-1671|note3=|repealed=n|archived=n|}}

| {{|Henry Viscount Irwin's estate: sale of lands for payment of debts and legacies.|private|6|06-03-1671|note3=|repealed=n|archived=n|}}

| {{|Granting Sir Philip Howard and Francis Watson sole use of an invention for the benefit of shipping.|private|7|06-03-1671|note3=|repealed=n|archived=n|}}

| {{|Enabling Francis Courtney to join with his father Sir William Courtney in a conveyance to settle their estate.|private|8|06-03-1671|note3=|repealed=n|archived=n|}}

| {{|Better payment of debts of Sir Clifford Clifton and raising portions for his daughters.|private|9|06-03-1671|note3=|repealed=n|archived=n|}}

| {{|Settling an agreement between Sir William Smith, Sir Thomas Hooke, German Poole and others.|private|10|06-03-1671|note3=|repealed=n|archived=n|}}

| {{|Sir John Fitz-James' estate: enabling daughters and coheirs to join in a sale of lands for payment of debts.|private|11|06-03-1671|note3=|repealed=n|archived=n|}}

| {{|Better explanation of an Act for making Falmouth church a parish church (16 Cha. 2 c. 10).|private|12|06-03-1671|note3=|repealed=n|archived=n|}}

| {{|Elizabeth, Mary and Letitia Hammond's estate: sale of lands.|private|13|06-03-1671|note3=|repealed=n|archived=n|}}

| {{|Rectification of a mistake in the dates of deeds mentioned in an Act to enable John Bill to sell lands in Kent and Surrey (22 Cha. 2 c. 19).|private|14|06-03-1671|note3=|repealed=n|archived=n|}}

| {{|Benedict Hall's estate: exchange and sale of lands for payment of debts.|private|15|06-03-1671|note3=|repealed=n|archived=n|}}

| {{|John Knight's estate: settling the manor of Portswood and other lands in Hampshire and Southampton to be sold for the payment of debts.|private|16|06-03-1671|note3=|repealed=n|archived=n|}}

| {{|Vesting and settling the fee simple of certain Crown lands in Portsmouth which have been taken into and spoiled by new fortifications there.|private|17|06-03-1671|note3=|repealed=n|archived=n|}}

| {{|Post Office Revenues Act 1670|private|18|note2=|06-03-1671|note3=|repealed=y|archived=n|An Act for explaining of a Proviso conteyned in an Act, entituled "An Act for settling the Profitts of ye Post-Office and Power of granteing Wine-Licences on His Royall Highnes ye Duke of Yorke and the Heyres Males of his Body." }}

| {{|Building of Arundel House.|private|19|06-03-1671|note3=|repealed=n|archived=n|}}

| {{|Enabling Charles Howard and Mary his wife to levy a fine and suffer a recovery of their estate in the manor of Dorking (Surrey).|private|20|06-03-1671|note3=|repealed=n|archived=n|}}

| {{|Enabling Henry Booth to levy fines and suffer recoveries.|private|21|06-03-1671|note3=|repealed=n|archived=n|}}

| {{|Enabling Sir Andrew Hackett to settle a portion of money on Mary his daughter.|private|22|06-03-1671|note3=|repealed=n|archived=n|}}

| {{|Sir William Clarke's estate: settling manor of Shabbington (Buckinghamshire) for payment of debts.|private|23|06-03-1671|note3=|repealed=n|archived=n|}}

| {{|Sir Thomas Ogle's estate: sale of lands for raising a portion and maintenance for his daughter and heir, and for payment of his debts.|private|24|06-03-1671|note3=|repealed=n|archived=n|}}

| {{|Improvement of Boston (Lincolnshire) and Trent navigation.|private|25|06-03-1671|note3=|repealed=n|archived=n|}}

| {{|Settling and preserving the River Wey navigation (Surrey).|private|26|06-03-1671|note3=|repealed=n|archived=n|}}

| {{|Uniting the vicarage and parsonage of Ross (Herefordshire).|private|27|06-03-1671|note3=|repealed=n|archived=n|}}

| {{|Making manor of Parisgarden a parish and enabling parishioners of St. Saviour's, Southwark to raise a maintenance for ministers and for repair of the church.|private|28|06-03-1671|note3=|repealed=n|archived=n|}}

| {{|Thomas Herlackenden's estate: sale of part for satisfaction of a debt due to the Crown.|private|29|06-03-1671|note3=|repealed=n|archived=n|}}

| {{|Settling John Sams' charity lands.|private|30|06-03-1671|note3=|repealed=n|archived=n|}}
}}

1672 (25 Cha. 2)

Tenth session of the Cavalier Parliament (4 February 1673 – 29 March 1673)

(Acts dated "1672" because passed before 25 March 1673, the end of the civil and legal year 1672.)

Public Acts

| {{|Popish Recusants Act 1672|note1=(also known as the Test Act 1673)|public|2|04-02-1673|note3=|repealed=y|archived=n|An Act for preventing Dangers which may happen from Popish Recusants.}}

| {{|Duchy of Cornwall Act 1672|public|3|04-02-1673|note3=|repealed=y|archived=n|An Act for enableing his Majestie to make Leases of his Lands belonging to the Dutchy of Cornwall.}}

| {{|Sale of Cattle Act 1672|public|4|04-02-1673|note3=|repealed=y|archived=n|An Act for repeale of a Clause in a former Act to prohibit Salesmen from selling Fatt Cattell.}}

| {{|General Pardon Act 1672|public|5|04-02-1673|note3=|repealed=y|archived=n|An Act for the Kings Majestyes most Gratious, Generall and Free Pardon.}}

| {{|Aliens Duty Act 1672|public|6|04-02-1673|note3=|repealed=y|archived=n|An Act for takeing off Aliens Duty upon Commodities of the Growth, Product and Manufacture of the Nation.}}

| {{|Trade Act 1672|note1=(also known as the Navigation Act 1673)|public|7|04-02-1673|note3=|repealed=y|archived=n|An Act for the incouragement of the Greeneland and Eastland Trades, and for the better secureing the Plantation Trade.}}

| {{|Coinage Act 1672|public|8|04-02-1673|note3=|repealed=y|archived=n|An Act for continuing a former Act concerning Coynage.}}

| {{|Durham (Representation of) Act 1672|public|9|04-02-1673|note3=|repealed=y|archived=n|An Act to enable the County Palatine of Durham to send Knights and Burgesses to serve in Parlyament.}}

| {{|Fire of London, Property Disputes Act 1672|public|10|04-02-1673|note3=|repealed=y|archived=n|An Act for reviveing the Judicature for determination of Differences touching Houses burnt downe and demolished by reason of the late Fire, which happened in London, and for rebuilding of the Navy Office.}}
}}

Private Acts

| {{|Enabling James Earl of Salisbury to grant leases of lands and tenements for not more than 40 years.|private|2|04-02-1673|note3=|repealed=n|archived=n|}}

| {{|Enabling the dean and chapter of Bristol cathedral to exchange Berkeley vicarage (Gloucestershire) with George Lord Berkeley for his rectory of St Michael in Sutton Bonnington (Nottinghamshire).|private|3|04-02-1673|note3=|repealed=n|archived=n|}}

| {{|Hanham estates: sale of land by trustees for payment of Sir William Hanham's debts and management of the estate of Sir John Hanham (an infant).|private|4|04-02-1673|note3=|repealed=n|archived=n|}}

| {{|Confirmation of Sir William Rich's marriage settlement.|private|5|04-02-1673|note3=|repealed=n|archived=n|}}

| {{|Confirmation of an award made by Sir Orlando Bridgeman for ending Sir Thomas Woolrich's family's differences and enabling John Woolrich and his heirs to execute the powers in the said award.|private|6|04-02-1673|note3=|repealed=n|archived=n|}}

| {{|Transfer of the interest of a term of years in certain manors and lands of Sir Robert Berkeley deceased and payment of portions to his grandchildren.|private|7|04-02-1673|note3=|repealed=n|archived=n|}}

| {{|Confirming agreements between Sir Ralph Bancks, Sir J. Hanham and others.|private|8|04-02-1673|note3=|repealed=n|archived=n|}}

| {{|Explaining and declaring the extent of an exception in a deed.|private|9|04-02-1673|note3=|repealed=n|archived=n|}}

| {{|Enabling Robert Bellamy to sell lands for payment of debts.|private|10|04-02-1673|note3=|repealed=n|archived=n|}}

| {{|Naturalization of Philip Lloyd.|private|11|04-02-1673|note3=|repealed=n|archived=n|}}
}}

1675 (27 Cha. 2)

Fourteenth session of the Cavalier Parliament (13 October 1675 – 16 November 1675). The 11th (October–November 1673), 12th (January–February 1674) and 13th Sessions (April–June 1675) did not pass any public acts.

Public Acts

}}

Private Acts

| {{|Better enabling Mary Countess Dowager of Warwick to perform the last will and testament of her husband Charles Earl of Warwick.|private|6|13-10-1675|note3=|repealed=n|archived=n|}}
| {{|Enabling Charles Cotton to sell lands for payment of debts and raising portions for younger children.|private|4|13-10-1675|note3=|repealed=n|archived=n|}}
| {{|Enabling Sir Francis Compton to sell the manor of Hamerton (Huntingdon).|private|2|13-10-1675|note3=|repealed=n|archived=n|}}
| {{|Grant of licence to Prince Rupert, Duke of Cumberland for thirty one years.|private|1|13-10-1675|note3=|repealed=n|archived=n|}}
| {{|Naturalization of Theodore Russell and others.|private|3|13-10-1675|note3=|repealed=n|archived=n|}}
| {{|William and Edward Lewis' estate: sale of lands in Glamorganshire and Monmouthshire for payment of debts and legacies.|private|5|13-10-1675|note3=|repealed=n|archived=n|}}
}}

1677

Fifteenth session of the Cavalier Parliament (15 February 1677 – 25 April 1677)

29 Cha. 2

Public Acts

| {{|Taxation (Beer and Ale) Act 1677|public|2|15-02-1677|note3=|repealed=y|archived=n|An Act for an additionall Excise upon Beere, Ale and other Liquors for Three years.}}

| {{|Statute of Frauds|public|3|15-02-1677|note3=|repealed=n|archived=n|An Act for prevention of Frauds and Perjuryes.}}

| {{|Southwark Fire, Property Disputes Act 1677|public|4|15-02-1677|note3=|repealed=y|archived=n|An Act for erecting a Judicature to determine Differences touching Houses burnt and demolished by the late dread full Fire in Southwarke.}}

| {{|Affidavits Act 1677|public|5|15-02-1677|note3=|repealed=y|archived=n|An Act for takeing of Affidavits in the Country to be made use of in the Courts of Kings Bench Common Pleas and Exchequer.}}

| {{|Naturalization (Children Born Abroad During the Troubles) Act 1677|public|6|15-02-1677|note3=|repealed=y|archived=n|An Act for the Naturalizing of Children of his Majestyes English Subjects borne in Forreigne Countryes during the late Troubles.}}

| {{|Sunday Observance Act 1677|public|7|15-02-1677|note3=|repealed=y|archived=n|An Act for the better Observation of the Lords Day commonly called Sunday.}}

| {{|Augmentation of Benefices Act 1677|public|8|15-02-1677|note3=|repealed=y|archived=n|An Act for confirming and perpetuating Augmentations made by Ecclesiasticall Persons to small Vicarages and Curacies.}}

| {{|Ecclesiastical Jurisdiction Act 1677|public|9|15-02-1677|note3=|repealed=y|archived=n|An Act for takeing away the Writt De Heretico cumburendo.}}

| {{|Yarmouth Haven and Pier Repairs (Continuance of Duties) Act 1677|public|10|15-02-1677|note3=|repealed=y|archived=n|An Act for the better repairing and maintaining the Piere of Great Yarmouth.}}
}}

Private Acts

| {{|Rectification of a mistake in the settlement of Lord Mainard's estate on the marriage of his son.|private|2|15-02-1677|note3=|repealed=n|archived=n|}}

| {{|Enabling Lady Mary Mordant to sell her interest in the manor of Bletchingley and various lands in Surrey despite her minority.|private|3|15-02-1677|note3=|repealed=n|archived=n|}}

| {{|Viscount Kilmorey's estate: payment of debts and raising portions for two of his younger sons.|private|4|15-02-1677|note3=|repealed=n|archived=n|}}

| {{|Explanatory and supplementary Act for better enabling Sir Francis Compton to sell and dispose of the manor of Hamerton (Huntingdon).|private|5|15-02-1677|note3=|repealed=n|archived=n|}}

| {{|Enabling Sir Edward Hungerford to lease Hungerford House, Strand (Middlesex) and adjoining houses and tenements.|private|6|15-02-1677|note3=|repealed=n|archived=n|}}

| {{|Herbert Awbrey's estate: sale of land for payment of debts.|private|7|15-02-1677|note3=|repealed=n|archived=n|}}

| {{|Settling a maintenance on the vicar of All Hallowes, Northampton.|private|8|15-02-1677|note3=|repealed=n|archived=n|}}

| {{|Thomas Barkley's estate: sale of land for payment of debts and raising portions for younger children.|private|9|15-02-1677|note3=|repealed=n|archived=n|}}

| {{|Naturalizing of Alice Rushot.|private|10|15-02-1677|note3=|repealed=n|archived=n|}}

| {{|Naturalization of Jacob David and others.|private|11|15-02-1677|note3=|repealed=n|archived=n|}}

| {{|Naturalization of Peter Reneu and others.|private|12|15-02-1677|note3=|repealed=n|archived=n|}}

| {{|Edward Standish's estate: sale of lands for payment of debts.|private|13|15-02-1677|note3=|repealed=n|archived=n|}}

| {{|Lawrence Squibb's estate: sale of lands in Winterbourne Whitchurch (Dorset).|private|14|15-02-1677|note3=|repealed=n|archived=n|}}
}}

29 & 30 Cha. 2

Fifteenth session (continued) of the Cavalier Parliament (28 January 1678 – 13 May 1678)

Public Acts

| {{|Moss Troopers Act 1677|public|2|20-03-1678|note3=|repealed=y|archived=n|An Act for continuance of two former Acts for preventing of Theft and Rapine upon the Northerne Borders of England.}}
}}

Private Acts

| {{|Ascertaining and establishing the interest of the lord and copyhold tenants of manors of West Derby and Wavertree (Lancashire) in relation to their fines and commons.|private|3|20-03-1678|note3=|repealed=n|archived=n|}}
}}
Bryan Viscount Cullen's estate: sale or disposal of lands in Elmsthorpe (Leicestershire) for payment of debts and raising a portion for his daughter. c. 6
Cobham House and Park: raising of money by trustees. c. 7
Correction of a settlement made by John Coke and alteration in part of a trust of the estate of Robert Coke. c. 10
Discharging Winestead (Yorkshire) manor from a settlement in tail and charging other manors and lands in Lincolnshire of greater value with the same uses. c. 12
Edward, Earl of Warwick and Holland's estate: enabling guardians to make leases during his minority. c. 4
Enabling Francis Brend to sell lands to raise £3000 for portions of his nieces Frances and Elizabeth Brend. c. 15
Enabling Sir John Cotton to dispose of a messuage called St Jermans and other lands near St Albans (Herefordshire) and to settle other lands in lieu. c. 8
Enabling Thomas Lord Morley and Mounteagle Baron of Rye to sell manor and lands in Farlton (Lancashire) for payment of debts. c. 5
Enabling Thomas Thynne of Longleat (Wiltshire) to settle a jointure on a wife. c. 11
Estate of Edward Bedell of Wood Rising (Norfolk): sale of lands and manors for payment of debts and for raising portions for his daughters and any future children. c. 14
Estate of William Gery of Bushmead (Bedfordshire): sale of lands for payment of debts. c. 13
Francis Shalcrosse's estate (Hertfordshire): settling of manors, farms and lands, making provision for younger children and payment of debts. c. 20
John Herring's estate: sale of lands for payment of debts. c. 22
John Samine's estate: sale of lands for payment of debts. c. 21
Naturalizing of Countess of Lincoln and others. c. 16
Restoration of the honour of Baron Audley of Hely to James Lord Audley and others. c. 17
Rodes v. Thornton: confirmation of Chancery decree dated 24 February 1675, and of conveyances and assurances made in pursuance of it for the payment of Sir Francis Rodes' debts and provision for his wife and children. c. 9
Sir Ralph Banks' estate: sale of land for payment of debts. c. 19
Sir William Thorold's (late of Hough (Lincolnshire)) estate: sale of lands for payment of debts. c. 23

1678

Sixteenth session of the Cavalier Parliament (23 May 1678 – 20 June 1678)

30 Cha. 2

Public Acts

| {{|Continuance of Acts, 1678|public|6|23-05-1678|note3=|repealed=y|archived=n|An Act for reviveing a former Act entituled "An Act for avoiding unnecessary Suits and Delayes and for continuance of one, other Act entituled An Act for the better settleing of Intestates Estates".}}
| {{|Executors of Executors (Waste) Act 1678|public|7|23-05-1678|note3=|repealed=y|archived=n|An Act to enable Creditors to recover their Debts of the Executors and Administrators of Executors in their owne wrong.}}
| {{|Fishing in the Severn Act 1678|public|9|23-05-1678|note3=|repealed=y|archived=n|An Act for Preservation of Fishing in the River of Seaverne.}}
| {{|Highways Act 1678|public|5|23-05-1678|note3=|repealed=y|archived=n|An Act for repealeing certaine words in a Clause in a former Act entituled "An Act for enlargeing and repaireing of Common Highwayes".}}
| {{|Insolvent Debtors Relief Act 1678|public|4|23-05-1678|note3=|repealed=y|archived=n|An Act for the further Reliefe and Discharge of poore distressed Prisoners for Debt.}}
| {{|Newcastle (Sale of Coal by Measured Keels) Act 1678|public|8|23-05-1678|note3=|repealed=y|archived=n|An Act for the Admeasurement of Keeles and Boates carrying Coales.}}
| {{|Taxation Act 1678|public|1|23-05-1678|note3=|repealed=y|archived=n|An Act for granting a Supply to His Majestie of Six hundred nineteene thousand three hundred eighty eight pounds eleaven shillings and nine pence for disbanding the Army and other uses therein mentioned.}}
| {{|Taxation (Wine) Act 1678|public|2|23-05-1678|note3=|repealed=y|archived=n|An Act for granting an additionall Duty to His Majestie upon Wines for Three years.}}
}}

Private Acts

}}
Edward Gresham's estate: sale of rectory of Westerham (Kent) for payment of debts. c. 12
Enabling Thomas Plater to sell lands for payment of debts charged upon them and reimbursing him money spent in repairing the breaches made by the inundation of the sea and keeping the waters out. c. 21
For uniting and consolidating churches of Beaumont and Moze (Essex) . c. 14
Increasing the revenue of the Dean of St. Paul's and assuring his tenants' estates in Shadwell (Middlesex). c. 11
John Forth's estate: making good a mortgage to Thomas Cooke and Nicholas Carey and making provision for his son Henry. c. 19
Naturalizing of John Schoppens and others. c. 18
On John Fortescue's behalf for executing trusts devolved upon infants. c. 15
River Fal (Cornwall) navigation. c. 20
Sir Thomas Cave's estate: better enabling trustees to sell lands for performance of his will and for vesting and settling other lands. c. 13
Sir Trevor Williams' estate: rectifying an omission in the settlement made on the marriage of his eldest son and enabling eldest son to make a jointure for a second wife. c. 10
Tanfield Mulso's estate: sale of lands for payment of debts and provision for children. c. 17

30 Cha. 2 St. 2

Seventeenth session of the Cavalier Parliament (21 October 1678 – 30 December 1678)

Public Acts

}}

1679 (31 Cha. 2)

Session of the Habeas Corpus Parliament (6 March 1679 – 12 July 1679)

Public Acts

| {{|Habeas Corpus Act 1679|public|2|06-03-1679|note3=|repealed=n|archived=n|An Act for the better securing the Liberty of the Subject, and for Prevention of Imprisonment beyond the Seas.}}
| {{|Records of Fires Burnt, etc. Act 1679|public|3|06-03-1679|note3=|repealed=y|archived=n|An Act for reingrossing of the Records of Fines burnt or lost in the late Fire in the Temple.}}
}}

Private Acts

| {{|Drake estates: confirmation of leases made by John Drake and others and enabling Sir Francis Drake to make a jointure and raise portions for his daughters and younger children.|private|4|06-03-1679|note3=|repealed=n|archived=n|}}
}}

1680–1689

1680 (32 Cha. 2)

Exclusion Bill Parliament

Public Acts

| {{|Importation Act 1680|public|2|21-10-1680|note3=|repealed=y|archived=n|An Act prohibiting the Importation of Catle from Ireland.}}
}}

Private Acts

}}

1685 (1 Ja. 2)

Loyal Parliament. James II prevented this parliament from sitting after 1685 and did not call any more parliaments, so he did not pass any laws after 1685.

Public Acts

| {{|Attainder, Duke of Monmouth Act 1685|public|2|19-05-1685|note3=|repealed=y|archived=n|An Act to Attaint James Duke of Monmouth of High-Treason.}}
| {{|Coal Duties for Rebuilding Saint Paul's Act 1685|public|15|19-05-1685|note3=|repealed=y|archived=n|An Act for Rebuilding Finishing and Adorning of the Cathedrall Church of St. Pauls London.}}
| {{|Coinage Act 1685|public|7|19-05-1685|note3=|repealed=y|archived=n|An Act for Reviveing and continuing Two former Acts for Encouragement of Coynage.}}
| {{|Duchy of Cornwall Act 1685|public|9|19-05-1685|note3=|repealed=y|archived=n|An Act to Enable His Majestie to make Grants Leases and Copies of Offices Lands and Hereditaments parcell of His Highnesses Dutchy of Cornwall or annexed to the same and for Confirmation of Leases and Grants already made.}}
| {{|Great Yarmouth Haven and Pier Repairs (Duties) Act 1685|public|16|19-05-1685|note3=|repealed=y|archived=n|An Act for Cleareing preserveing Maintaineing and Repaireing the Haven and Piers of Great Yarmouth.}}
| {{|Importation Act 1685|public|6|19-05-1685|note3=|repealed=y|archived=n|An Act for repealing certaine Clauses in an Act of Parlyament made in the Nine and twentyeth and Thirtyeth yeares of the Raigne of His late Majestie for Prohibiting French Commoddities.}}
| {{|Importing, etc., of Gunpowder, etc. Act 1685|public|8|19-05-1685|note3=|repealed=y|archived=n|An Act against the Importation of Gun-powder Arms and other Ammunition and Utensils of Warr.}}
| {{|Moss Troopers Act 1685|public|14|19-05-1685|note3=|repealed=y|archived=n|An Act for Continuance of Three former Acts for Preventing of Theft and Rapine upon the Northerne Borders of England.}}
| {{|Navy and Ordnance Act 1685|public|11|19-05-1685|note3=|repealed=y|archived=n|An Act for Reviveing an Act for Providing of Carriages by Land and by Water for the Use of His Majestyes Navy and Ordnance.}}
| {{|Post Office, etc., Revenues Act 1685|public|12|19-05-1685|note3=|repealed=y|archived=n|An Act for Consolidating the Estates Tail and Reversion in Fee which His Majestie hath in the Post-Office and Twenty foure thousand pounds per Annum of the Hereditary Excise.}}
| {{|Providing of Carriages for the King Act 1685|public|10|19-05-1685|note3=|repealed=y|archived=n|An Act for the Providing necessary Carriages for His Majestie in His Royall Progresse and Removalls.}}
| {{|Revenue Act 1685|public|1|19-05-1685|note3=|repealed=y|archived=n|An Act for setleing the Revenue on His Majestie for His Life which was setled on His late Majestie for His Life.}}
| {{|Ships Act 1685|public|18|19-05-1685|note3=|repealed=y|archived=n|An Act to encourage the Building of Shipps in England.}}
| {{|Taxation (Wine and Vinegar) Act 1685|public|3|19-05-1685|note3=|repealed=y|archived=n|An Act for Granting His Majestie an Imposition upon all Wines and Vineger Imported betweene the Foure and twentyeth day of June One thousand six hundred eighty five and the Foure and twentyeth day of June One thousand six hundred ninety and three.}}
| {{|Taxation (Tobacco and Sugar) Act 1685|public|4|19-05-1685|note3=|repealed=y|archived=n|An Act for Granting to His Majestie an Imposition upon all Tobacco and Sugar Imported betweene the Foure and twentyeth day of June One thousand six hundred eighty five and the Foure and twentyeth day of June One thousand six hundred ninety three.}}
| {{|Taxation Act 1685|public|5|19-05-1685|note3=|repealed=y|archived=n|An Act for Granting an Aid to his Majestie by an Imposition on all French Linnens and all East-India Linnen and severall other Manufactures of India and on all French wrought Silks and Stuffs and on all other wrought Silks and on all Brandyes Imported after the First Day of July One thousand six hundred Eighty five and before the First Day of July One thousand six hundred and ninety.}}
| {{|Tillage Act 1685|public|19|19-05-1685|note3=|repealed=y|archived=n|An Additionall Act for the Improvement of Tillage.}}
| {{|Trade Act 1685|public|13|19-05-1685|note3=|repealed=y|archived=n|An Act for Reviveing a former Act for Exporting of Leather.}}
}}

Private Acts

| {{|Repealing a clause for dividing commons in an Act for draining the Bedford level (15 Cha. 2 c. 9).|private|2|19-05-1685|note3=|repealed=n|archived=n|}}

| {{|Enabling James Earl of Ossory to make a jointure for a future wife.|private|3|19-05-1685|note3=|repealed=n|archived=n|}}

| {{|Naturalization of John Esselbron, Otto Geertz, David Becceler and others.|private|4|19-05-1685|note3=|repealed=n|archived=n|}}

| {{|Rebuilding of Earl of Powis's house, Lincoln's Inn Fields.|private|5|19-05-1685|note3=|repealed=n|archived=n|}}

| {{|Rochester water supply.|private|6|19-05-1685|note3=|repealed=n|archived=n|}}

| {{|Naturalization of Magdalen Pellasary and others.|private|7|19-05-1685|note3=|repealed=n|archived=n|}}

| {{|Naturalization of James Dufay, Theodore Janssen and others.|private|8|19-05-1685|note3=|repealed=n|archived=n|}}

| {{|Enabling Edward Meller to sell lands for payment of debts.|private|9|19-05-1685|note3=|repealed=n|archived=n|}}

| {{|Creation of St. James' Parish, Westminster.|private|10|19-05-1685|note3=|repealed=n|archived=n|}}

| {{|Repair of Cathedral Church of Bangor, maintenance of choir and augmentation of revenue of the Bishopric of Bangor and of several vicarages within the comportions of Landinum (Bangor diocese).|private|11|19-05-1685|note3=|repealed=n|archived=n|}}
}}

1688

1 Will. & Mar.

Convention Parliament (1689)

Public Acts

| {{|Clergy, Ireland Act 1688|public|29|13-02-1689|note3=|repealed=y|archived=n|An Act for Reliefe of the Protestant Irish Clergy.}}
| {{|Coronation Oath Act 1688|public|6|13-02-1689|note3=|repealed=n|archived=n|An Act for Establishing the Coronation Oath.}}
| {{|Court of Marches of Wales Act 1688|public|27|13-02-1689|note3=|repealed=y|archived=n|An Act for takeing away the Court holden before the President and Councill of the Marches of Wales.}}
| {{|Excise Act 1688|public|24|13-02-1689|note3=|repealed=y|archived=n|An Act for an Additionall Duty of Excise upon Beere Ale and other Liquors.}}
| {{|Exportation (Corn) Act 1688|public|12|13-02-1689|note3=|repealed=y|archived=n|An Act for the Encouraging the Exportation of Corne.}}
| {{|Exportation (Beer and Cider) Act 1688|public|22|13-02-1689|note3=|repealed=y|archived=n|An Act for the Exportation of Beere, Ale, Syder and Mum.}}
| {{|Exportation (Leather) Act 1688|public|23|13-02-1689|note3=|repealed=y|archived=n|An Act for Reviveing two former Acts for Exporting of Leather.}}
| {{|Great Seal Act 1688|public|21|13-02-1689|note3=|repealed=n|archived=n|An Act for enabling Lords Commissioners for the Great Seale to execute the Office of Lord Chancellor or Lord Keeper.}}
| {{|Great Yarmouth Haven and Pier Repairs Act 1688|public|11|13-02-1689|note3=|repealed=y|archived=n|An Act for the Explaining and makeing Effectuall a Statute made in the First Yeare of King James the Second concerning the Haven and Pieres of Great Yarmouth.}}
| {{|Habeas Corpus Suspension Act 1688|public|2|13-02-1689|note3=|repealed=y|archived=n|An Act for Impowering His Majestie to Apprehend and Detaine such Persons as He shall finde just Cause to Suspect are Conspireing against the Government.}}
| {{|Habeas Corpus Suspension (No 2) Act 1688|public|7|13-02-1689|note3=|repealed=y|archived=n|An Act for Impowering His Majestie to Apprehend and Detaine such Persons as He shall finde Just Cause to Suspect are Conspireing against the Government.}}
| {{|Habeas Corpus Suspension (No 3) Act 1688|public|19|13-02-1689|note3=|repealed=y|archived=n|An Act for Impowering Their Majestyes to Committ without Baile such Persons as They shall finde Just Cause to suspect are Conspireing against the Government.}}
| {{|Hearth Money Act 1688|public|10|13-02-1689|note3=|repealed=y|archived=n|An Act for the takeing away the Revenue ariseing by Hearth-Money.}}
| {{|Leather Act 1688|public|33|13-02-1689|note3=|repealed=y|archived=n|An Act for Explaining part of an Act made in the first yeare of King James the First concerning Tanned Leather.}}
| {{|Legal Proceedings Act 1688|public|4|13-02-1689|note3=|repealed=y|archived=n|An Act for Reviveing of Actions and Processe lately Depending in the Courts at Westminster and Discontinued by the not holding of Hillary Terme and for supplying other Defects relateing to Proceedings at Law.}}
| {{|Mutiny Act 1688|public|5|13-02-1689|note3=|repealed=y|archived=n|An Act for punishing Officers or Soldiers who shall Mutiny or Desert Their Majestyes Service.}}
| {{|Oaths Act 1688|public|25|13-02-1689|note3=|repealed=y|archived=n|An Act to Regulate the Administracion of the Oathes required to be taken by Commission or Warrant Officers imployed in their Majestyes Service by Land by Vertue of an Act made this present Session of Parliament Entituled An Act for the Abrogating of the Oaths of Supremacy and Allegiance and appointing other Oaths.}}
| {{|Oaths of Allegiance and Supremacy Act 1688|public|8|13-02-1689|note3=|repealed=y|archived=n|An Act for the Abrogating of the Oathes of Supremacy and Allegiance and Appointing other Oathes.}}
| {{|Papists Act 1688|public|9|13-02-1689|note3=|repealed=y|archived=n|An Act for the Amoving Papists and reputed Papists from the Cityes of London and Westminster and Ten Miles distance from the same.}}
| {{|Papists Act 1688|public|15|13-02-1689|note3=|repealed=y|archived=n|An Act for the better secureing the Government by disarming Papists and reputed Papists.}}
| {{|Papists (Amendment) Act 1688|public|17|13-02-1689|note3=|repealed=y|archived=n|An Act for rectifying a Mistake in a certaine Act of this present Parliament For the amoveing Papists from the Cities of London and Westminster.}}
| {{|Parliament Act 1688|public|1|13-02-1689|note3=|repealed=n|archived=n|An Act for removeing and Preventing all Questions and Disputes concerning the Assembling and Sitting of this present Parlyament.}}
| {{|Presentation of Benefices Act 1688|public|26|13-02-1689|note3=|repealed=y|archived=n|An Act to vest in the two Universities the Presentations of Benefices belonging to Papists.}}
| {{|Revenue Act 1688|public|14|13-02-1689|note3=|repealed=y|archived=n|An Act for preventing Doubts and Questions concerning the Collecting the Publique Revenue.}}
| {{|Royal Mines Act 1688|note1=(also known as the Mines Royal Act 1688)|public|30|13-02-1689|note3=|repealed=n|archived=n|An Act to Repeale the Statute made in the fifth yeare of King Henry the Fourth against the Multiplying Gold and Silver.}}
| {{|Simony Act 1688|public|16|13-02-1689|note3=|repealed=n|archived=n|An Act that the Simoniacall Promotion of one Person may not prejudice another.}}
| {{|Taxation Act 1688|public|3|13-02-1689|note3=|repealed=y|archived=n|An Act for the granting a present Ayd to Their Majestyes.}}
| {{|Taxation Act 1688|public|13|13-02-1689|note3=|repealed=y|archived=n|An Act for raising Money by a Poll and otherwise towards the Reducing of Ireland.}}
| {{|Land Tax Act 1688|public|20|13-02-1689|note3=|repealed=y|archived=n|An Act for a Grant to Their Majestyes of an Ayde of Twelve pence in the Pound for One Yeare for the necessary Defence of Their Realmes.}}
| {{|Land Tax (Commissioners) Act 1688|public|31|13-02-1689|note3=|repealed=y|archived=n|An Additionall Act for the Appointing Commissioners for the Executing an Act of this present Parliament Entituled An Act for a Grant to their Majestyes of an Ayde of Twelve Pence in the Pound for One Yeare for the necessary Defence of their Realmes.}}
| {{|Toleration Act 1689|public|18|13-02-1689|note3=|repealed=y|archived=n|An Act for Exempting their Majestyes Protestant Subjects dissenting from the Church of England from the Penalties of certaine Lawes.}}
| {{|Trade with France Act 1688|public|34|13-02-1689|note3=|repealed=y|archived=n|An Act for Prohibiting all Trade and Commerce with France.}}
| {{|Woollen Manufactures Act 1688|public|32|13-02-1689|note3=|repealed=y|archived=n|An Act for the better preventing the Exportation of Woole and Encourageing the Woollen Manufactures of this Kingdome.}}
}}

Private Acts
Annulling Algernoon Sydney's attainder. c. 7
Annulling Alicia Lisle's attainder. c. 8
Annulling William Lord Russell's attainder. c. 1
Better assurance of manor of Silton and other lands to Joseph Soley in Silton (Salop.). c. 12
Better regulation of Droitwich salt works. c. 19
Enabling Hannah Sherley and her daughter Mary Battilhey to sell and dispose of lands in Middlesex and Essex. c. 22
Enabling Robert Penwarne to sell lands to pay his siblings' portions and to pay debts. c. 13
Enabling Theodore Bathurst to make a jointure for his wife and to charge monies on part of his estate in Yorkshire. c. 15
Enabling Thomas Chettell to sell part of his estate for payment of debts and making provision for wife and children. c. 20
Enabling Younger Cooke to sell lands for payment of debts and provision for younger children. c. 5
Erecting Bristol and Gloucester Courts of Conscience. c. 18
Erecting Newcastle upon Tyne Court of Conscience. c. 17
Exhibiting a Bill in Parliament for naturalizing Prince George of Denmark. c. 2
For building into tenements the remaining inclosed part of Arundel Ground. c. 10
Henry Coventry's estate: sale or leasing of a capital messuage in Piccadilly. c. 9
Making good a recovery suffered by the Earl of Peterborough and Lord Mordaunt. c. 14
Naturalization and settling the precedence of Prince George of Denmark. c. 3
Naturalization of Anne Astley and others. c. 11
Naturalization of Frederick Count Schomberg and others. c. 4
Naturalization of Henry de Nassau and others. c. 6
Reversing Henry Cornish's attainder. c. 16
Richard Hele's estate: enabling trustees to grant leases. c. 21

1 Will. & Mar. Sess. 2

Public Acts

| {{|Indemnity Act 1688|public|8|23-10-1689|note3=|repealed=y|archived=n|An Act for preventing vexatious Suits against such as acted in order to the bringing in their Majestyes or for their Service.}}
| {{|Mutiny Act 1688|public|4|23-10-1689|note3=|repealed=y|archived=n|An Act for punishing Officers or Soldiers who shall Mutiny or Desert Their Majestyes Service and for punishing False Musters.}}
| {{|Relief of Irish Protestants Act 1688|public|9|23-10-1689|note3=|repealed=y|archived=n|An Act for the better Security and Reliefe of their Majesties Protestant Subjects of Ireland.}}
| {{|Revenue Act 1688|public|3|23-10-1689|note3=|repealed=y|archived=n|An Act for preventing all Doubts and Questions concerning the Collecting the Publique Revenue.}}
| {{|Taxation Act 1688|public|1|23-10-1689|note3=|repealed=y|archived=n| An Act for a Grant to Their Majestyes of an Ayd of Two shillings in the Pound for One Yeare.}}
| {{|Taxation Act 1688|public|5|23-10-1689|note3=|repealed=y|archived=n|An Act for a Grant to Their Majestyes of an Additionall Ayd of Twelve Pence in the Pound for One Yeare.}}
| {{|Taxation Act 1688|public|6|23-10-1689|note3=|repealed=y|archived=n|An Act for the Charging and Collecting the Duties upon Coffee Tea and Chocolate at the Custome-House.}}
| {{|Taxation Act 1688|public|7|23-10-1689|note3=|repealed=y|archived=n|An Act for Review of the late Poll Granted to Their Majestyes and for an Additionall Poll towards the Reducing of Ireland.}}
}}

Private Acts
Discharge of Duke of Norfolk and trustees of Henry late Duke of Norfolk upon payment of certain sums of money to Lady Elizabeth Teresa Russell. c. 5
Enabling Charles Earl of Radnor to make a jointure and to raise money out of lands and tenements in Cornwall. c. 6
Enabling Edward Viscount Hereford to settle a jointure on his marriage to Elizabeth Narbourne despite his minority. c. 3
Enabling Thomas Edon to sell land for payment of debts and making provision for wife and any future children. c. 7
Enabling William Batson to sell lands in Oxfordshire and to purchase and settle lands in Suffolk to the same uses. c. 8
Naturalization of John Rogerson. c. 2
Naturalization of William Watts. c. 1
Provision for maintenance of children of Sydney Wortley or Montague. c. 4

1689 (2 Will. & Mar.)

2nd Parliament of William and Mary

Public Acts

| {{|Crown and Parliament Recognition Act 1689|public|1|20-03-1690|note3=|repealed=n|archived=n|An Act for Recognizing King William and Queene Mary and for avoiding all Questions touching the Acts made in the Parliament assembled at Westminster the thirteenth day of February one thousand six hundred eighty eight.}}
| {{|Distress for Rent Act 1689|public|5|20-03-1690|note3=|repealed=n|archived=n|An Act for enabling the Sale of Goods distrained for Rent in case the Rent be not paid in a reasonable time.}}
| {{|General Pardon Act 1689|public|10|20-03-1690|note3=|repealed=y|archived=n|An Act for the King and Queens most Gracious Generall and Free Pardon.}}
| {{|Importation Act 1689|public|9|20-03-1690|note3=|repealed=y|archived=n|An Act for the discouraging the Importation of Throwne Silke.}}
| {{|London, Quo Warranto Judgment Reversed Act 1689|public|8|20-03-1690|note3=|repealed=y|archived=n|An Act for Reversing the Judgment in a Quo Warranto against the City of London and for Restoreing the City of London to its antient Rights and Privileges.}}
| {{|Parliamentary Elections Act 1689|public|7|20-03-1690|note3=|repealed=y|archived=n|An Act to Declare the Right and Freedome of Election of Members to serve in Parlyament for the Cinque Ports.}}
| {{|Taxation Act 1689|public|2|20-03-1690|note3=|repealed=y|archived=n|An Act for Raising Money by a Poll and otherwise towards the Reduceing of Ireland and Prosecuting the Warr against France.}}
| {{|Taxation (Liquor) Act 1689|public|3|20-03-1690|note3=|repealed=y|archived=n|An Act for granting to their Majestyes for their Lives and the Life of the Survivour of them certaine Impositions upon Beere Ale and other Liquors.}}
| {{|Taxation (Tonnage and Poundage) Act 1689|public|4|20-03-1690|note3=|repealed=y|archived=n|An Act for granting to Their Majesties a Subsidie of Tonnage and Poundage and other Sums of Money payable upon Merchandizes Exported and Imported.}}
}}

Private Acts
Cadwallader Wynne's estate: vesting in trustees for payment of debts. c. 13
Confirming privileges and trade to Hudson's Bay Company. c. 15
Correction of a mistake in an Act concerning Henry Coventry's estate [1 Will. & Mar. c. 9]. c. 2
Enabling Algernoon Earl of Essex to make a jointure for his wife, repay a loan for Lady Morpeth's portion and to settle his estate on his marriage. c. 5
Enabling John Wolstenholm to sell lands for payment of debts. c. 3
Enabling Sir Edwin Sadlier to sell lands for payment of debts. c. 17
Enabling Sir Humphry Forester to settle and dispose of lands. c. 11
Enabling Sir Robert Fenwicke to sell lands for payment of debts. c. 8
Enabling Thomas Berenger to sell lands for payment of debts. c. 12
For encouraging the manufacture of white paper. c. 16
For the sale of Harleyford mansion house, the manor of Great Marlow and other lands in Buckinghamshire. c. 7
Granting an annuity to Lady Alexander in satisfaction of the lands which she was to have had for her jointure. c. 18
Making illegitimate any children which Jane, wife of John Lewknor, has or shall have during her elopement from him. c. 4
Making provision for Anthony Earl of Shaftesbury's children. c. 6
Making Wortenbury chapel a distinct church from Bangor parish church. c. 1
Naturalization of David Le Grand and others. c. 14
Sir Hugh Midleton's estate: confirmation of settlement for maintenance for his wife and other trusts, and sale of part for payment of debts. c. 9
Vesting for sale the freehold of the manor and advowson of Lolworth (Cambridgeshire) and other lands in Lolworth and Long Stanton (Cambridgeshire) in trustees for John Edwards of Debden Hall (Essex). c. 10

1690–1699

1690 (2 Will. & Mar. Sess. 2)

Public Acts

| {{|Coals Act 1690|public|7|02-10-1690|note3=|repealed=y|archived=n|An Act for Reviveing a former Act for Regulating the Measures and Prices of Coales.}}
| {{|Indemnity Act 1690|public|13|02-10-1690|note3=|repealed=y|archived=n|An Act for preventing Vexatious Suites against such as acted for Their Majestyes Service in defence of the Kingdome.}}
| {{|Insolvent Debtors Relief Act 1690|public|15|02-10-1690|note3=|repealed=y|archived=n|An Act for Reliefe of poore Prisoners for Debt or Damages.}}
| {{|London Streets, etc. Act 1690|public|8|02-10-1690|note3=|repealed=y|archived=n|All Act for Paveing and Cleansing the Streets in the Cityes of London and Westminster and Suburbs and Liberties thereof and Out-Parishes in the County of Midlesex and in the Burrough of Southwarke and other places within the Weekly Bills of Mortality in the County of Surrey and for Regulating the Markets therein mentioned.}}
| {{|Militia Act 1690|public|12|02-10-1690|note3=|repealed=y|archived=n|An Act for Appointing and Enabling Commissioners to Examine Take and State the Publicke Accounts -of the Kingdome.}}
| {{|Mutiny Act 1690|public|6|02-10-1690|note3=|repealed=y|archived=n|An Act for Punishing Officers and Soldiers who shall mutiny or desert their Majestyes Service and for punishing false Musters.}}
| {{|Public Accounts Act 1690|public|11|02-10-1690|note3=|repealed=y|archived=n|An Act for Appointing and Enabling Commissioners to Examine Take and State the Publicke Accounts of the Kingdome.}}
| {{|Taxation Act 1690|public|1|02-10-1690|note3=|repealed=y|archived=n|An Act for Granting an Ayd to Their Majestyes of the Summe of Sixteene hundred fifty one thousand seaven hundred and two pounds eighteene shillings.}}
| {{|Taxation (Beer) Act 1690|public|3|02-10-1690|note3=|repealed=y|archived=n|An Act for doubling the Duty of Excise upon Beere Ale and other Liquors dureing the space of one yeare.}}
| {{|Taxation Act 1690|public|4|02-10-1690|note3=|repealed=y|archived=n|An Act, for granting to their Majesties certaine Impositions upon all East India Goods and Manufactures and upon all wrought Silks and severall other Goods and Merchandize to be imported after the five and twentyeth day of December one thousand six hundred and ninety.}}
| {{|Taxation Act 1690|public|5|02-10-1690|note3=|repealed=y|archived=n|An Act for the Continuance of severall former Acts therein mentioned for the laying severall Duties upon Wines Vinegar and Tobacco.}}
| {{|Taxation Act 1690|public|9|02-10-1690|note3=|repealed=y|archived=n|An Act for the Encourageing the Distilling of Brandy and Spirits from Come and for laying severall Dutyes on Low Wines or Spirits of the first Extraction.}}
| {{|Taxation Act 1690|public|10|02-10-1690|note3=|repealed=y|archived=n|An Act for Granting to their Majesties severall Additional) Duties of Excise upon Beere Ale and other Liquors for foure yeares from the time that an Act for doubling the Duty of Excise upon Beere Ale and other Liquors dureing the space of one yeare doth expire.}}
| {{|Trade with France Act 1690|public|14|02-10-1690|note3=|repealed=y|archived=n|An Act for the more effectuall puting in Execution an Act Entituled "An Act for Prohibiting all Trade and Commerce with France".}}
}}

Private Acts
 David Bigg's estate: sale of messuages and tenements for purchase of more convenient lands. c. 5
 Enabling Dacres Barrett or Lennard to charge the reversion of his estate with £1500. c. 2
 Enabling Elizabeth Mountague to lease houses and ground in Stepney (Middlesex). c. 6
 Enabling John Rosseter to sell lands for payment of debts. c. 26
 Enabling Philip Hildeyard to sell lands in Surrey and to settle lands in Lincolnshire in lieu. c. 21
 Enabling Thomas Earl of Aylesbury and Elizabeth Countess of Aylesbury to make provision for payment of debts and to lease their estates. c. 22
 Enabling Thomas Sheafe to sell lands for payment of debts and making provision for his wife. c. 23
 Francis Phelips' estate: sale of manor of Kempton, Kempton park and other lands. c. 1
 George Vilet's estate: sale of manors and lands for raising portions for his daughters. c. 4
 John Baines' estate (City of London): sale of lands for payment of debts. c. 12
 Limiting the powers of James Earl of Salisbury to cut off the entail of his estate. c. 8
 Marlborough (Wiltshire) thatched roofs prohibition. c. 3
 Mary Wharton and James Campbell marriage annulment. c. 9
 Naturalization of Francis de la Chambre and others. c. 13
 Nicholas Bagnall's estate (Ireland): barring a remainder limited to Dudley Bagnall. c. 14
 Reginald Bray's estate: better enabling Jane Bray his widow to raise portions for her daughters. c. 16
 Richard Cooke's estate: sale of land for payment of debts and raising a portion for his daughter. c. 11
 Saint Leger Scroope's estate: sale of lands for payment of debts. c. 15
 Sale of Henry Serve's estate. c. 17
 Securing the portion of Elizabeth Lucy, breeding her up a Protestant and transferring the trust for that purpose. c. 19
 Settling Robert Ask's Charity to the Company of Haberdashers of London. c. 18
 Sir Samuel Bernardiston's estate: freeing from incumbrances occasioned by a judgement given against him. c. 10
 Thomas Manwaring's estate: sale of land for payment of debts. c. 25
 Thomas Williams' estate: leasing for payment of debts. c. 20
 To give Katherine Lady Cornbury powers to act as if she were full age. c. 7
 York Buildings Waterworks: incorporation of proprietors and development of the works. c. 24

1691 (3 Will. & Mar.)

Public Acts

| {{|Cattle Act 1691|public|8|22-10-1691|note3=|repealed=y|archived=n|An Act for the Encouragement of the breeding and feeding of Cattell.}}
| {{|Correspondence with Enemies Act 1691|public|13|22-10-1691|note3=|repealed=y|archived=n|An Act against corresponding with Their Majesties Enemies.}}
| {{|Deer Stealers Act 1691|public|10|22-10-1691|note3=|repealed=y|archived=n|An Act for the more effectual Discovery and Punishment of Deer Stealers.}}
| {{|Fraudulent Devises Act 1691|public|14|22-10-1691|note3=|repealed=y|archived=n|An Act for Relief of Creditors against Fraudulent Devises.}}
| {{|Highways, etc. Act 1691|public|12|22-10-1691|note3=|repealed=y|archived=n|An Act for the better repairing and amending the Highways and for settling the Rates of Carriage of Goods.}}
| {{|Militia Act 1691|public|7|22-10-1691|note3=|repealed=y|archived=n|An Act for raising the Militia of this Kingdom for the Year One thousand six hundred ninety and two although the Months Pay formerly advanced be not repaid.}}
| {{|Oaths of Supremacy, etc., Ireland Act 1691|public|2|22-10-1691|note3=|repealed=y|archived=n|An Act for the Abrogating the Oath of Supremacy in Ireland and Appointing other Oaths.}}
| {{|Poor Relief Act 1691|public|11|22-10-1691|note3=|repealed=y|archived=n|An Act for the better Explanation and supplying the Defects of the former Laws for the Settlement of the Poor.}}
| {{|Prize Act 1691|public|4|22-10-1691|note3=|repealed=y|archived=n|An Act for Preserving Two Ships Lading of Bay Salt taken as Prize for the Benefitt of Their Majesties Navy.}}
| {{|Taxation Act 1691|public|1|22-10-1691|note3=|repealed=y|archived=n|An Act for granting to Their Majesties certain Impositions upon Beere Ale and other Liquors for One Year.}}
| {{|Land Tax Act 1691|public|5|22-10-1691|note3=|repealed=y|archived=n|An Act for Granting an Aid to Their Majesties of the Summe of Sixteene hundred fifty one thousand seven hundred and two pounds eighteen shillings towards the Carrying on a Vigorous Warre against France.}}
| {{|Taxation Act 1691|public|6|22-10-1691|note3=|repealed=y|archived=n|An Act for raiseing money by a Poll payable quarterly for One year for the carrying on a vigorous War against France.}}
| {{|Taxation Act 1691|public|15|22-10-1691|note3=|repealed=y|archived=n|An Act for the better ordering and collecting the Duty upon Low Wines and Strong [Waters] and preventing the Abuses therein.}}
| {{|Tithes Act 1691|public|3|22-10-1691|note3=|repealed=y|archived=n|An Act for the better Ascertaining the Tythes of Hemp and Flax.}}
}}

Private Acts
 Barbary and John Newton's estate: settlement of manor and lordship of Kings Bromley [Staffordshire] and other lands. c. 39
 Better performance of Richard Campion's will. c. 17
 Bishop of Ely's estate: settling Hatton Garden (Middlesex) on Christopher, Viscount Hatton, subject to an annual fee farm rent of £100 payable to the Bishop of Ely. c. 2
 Bishopric of London's estate: sale of manor of Bushley (Worcestershire) and purchase of other lands. c. 27
 Charles Pelham's estate: provision of £5000 for his daughter Anne. c. 34
 Edward Smith's estate: raising money for payment of debts and making a provision for children. c. 13
 Enabling the Earl of Winchelsea to settle a jointure on any wife he marries during his minority. c. 16
 Francis Moore's estate: power to sell the manor of Bayhouse and lands in West Thurrock (Essex) and to purchase and settle other land in lieu. c. 19
 George Mountague's estate: sale of lands in Gloucestershire for payment of children's portions. c. 7
 Henry Drax's estate: vesting in Thomas Shatterden and others and enabling them to make a jointure. c. 10
 Henry Halsted's estate: lease for the improvement of his prebend of Eald Street in the Church of St. Paul, London. c. 26
 Henry, Duke of Grafton's estate: sale of land in St. James and St. Martin-in-the-Fields. c. 41
 Incorporation of Shadwell waterworks. c. 37
 James, Earl of Salisbury's estate: better securing of portions, debts and legacies. c. 21
 James, Earl of Suffolk's estate: sale of manor of Hadstock (Essex) and discharge of others from £5000, the remainder of £10,000 originally charged thereon. c. 31
 James, Lord Waldgrave's estate: power to grant leases and copyhold estates for payment of arrears of annuities of his father. c. 18
 John Cripps' estate: sale of estate in Kent and settlement of another. c. 22
 John Keble's estate: sale of lands in Stowmarket (Suffolk) and settlement of other lands in lieu. c. 42
 Lincolnshire, Berkshire and Devon estates: sale and settlement of others. c. 33
 Making a 12-year lease made by Earl and Countess of Aylesbury, which was determinable on their deaths, absolute for 12 years. c. 1
 Manors of Albury and North Mimms (Hertfordshire): copyhold enfranchisements. c. 20
 Maurice Shelton's estate: sale of land for payment of debts and legacies and settlement of other land in lieu. c. 12
 More speedy payment of debts of Elizabeth Curtis and performance of a related agreement between Charles Curtis and Edward Earl according to a Chancery decree. c. 32
 Naturalization of Mainhardt, Duke of Leinster. c. 24
 Naturalization of Marquis of Monpavillan and others. c. 30
 Naturalization of Sir Martin Beckman. c. 4
 Nicholas Martyn's estate: sale of the manor of Manworthy (Devon) for payment of debts. c. 9
 Philip Hildeyard's estate: vesting manor of East Horsley (Surrey) in trustees for payment of debts. c. 35
 Philip, Lord Stanhopp's marriage settlement enabling. c. 25
 Richard Roberts' estate: sale of lands in Leicestershire for payment of debts and raising of portions. c. 8
 Settling a jointure on Jane Matthews. c. 6
 Sir Dudley Cullum's estate: raising money for siblings' portions. c. 11
 Sir Edwin Sadler's estate: sale of land for payment of debts. c. 40
 Sir Thomas Burton's estate: sale of land for payment of debts. c. 14
 Sir Thomas Putt's estate: leasing for payment of legacies to his three sisters and of debts. c. 3
 Sir William Halford's estate: sale of lands in Leicestershire for payment of debts and legacies. c. 38
 Vincent Grantham's estate: leasing of manor of Golthoe (Lincolnshire) to pay debts and raise portions. c. 29
 William and Jenkin Vaughan estates: vesting property in Merioneth in trustees to be sold or mortgaged for payment of debts. c. 28
 William Davile's estate: sale of land for payment of debts. c. 15
 William Molineaux's estate: vesting land in trustees to raise portions for younger siblings pursuant to a Chancery decree. c. 23
 William Stydolph's estate: sale of the advowson and of the manor and lands in Wittering (Northamptonshire). c. 5

1692 (4 Will. & Mar.)

Public Acts

| {{|Cheese and Butter Trade Act 1692|public|7|04-11-1692|note3=|repealed=y|archived=n|An Act to prevent Abuses committed by the Traders in Butter and Cheese.}}
| {{|Clandestine Mortgages Act 1692|public|16|04-11-1692|note3=|repealed=y|archived=n|An Act to prevent Frauds by Clandestine Mortgages.}}
| {{|Crown Office Procedure Act 1692|public|22|04-11-1692|note3=|repealed=y|archived=n|An Act for regulateing Proceedings in the Crowne Office of the Court of King's Bench att Westminster.}}
| {{|Estreats: Personal Representatives Act 1692|public|24|04-11-1692|note3=|repealed=y|archived=n|An Act for reviving continuing and explaining several Laws therein mentioned that are expired and neare expiring.}}
| {{|Game Act 1692|public|23|04-11-1692|note3=|repealed=y|archived=n|An Act for the more easie discoverie and conviction of such as shall destroy the Game of this Kingdome.}}
| {{|Greenland Trade Act 1692|public|17|04-11-1692|note3=|repealed=y|archived=n|An Act for the regaining encourageing and settling the Greenland Trade.}}
| {{|Highways, Hertfordshire Act 1692|public|9|04-11-1692|note3=|repealed=y|archived=n|An Act for reviving two former Acts of Parliament for the repaireing the Highways in the County of Hertford}}
| {{|Importation Act 1692|public|10|04-11-1692|note3=|repealed=y|archived=n|An Act for prohibiting the importation of all Forreigne Haire Buttons.}}
| {{|Indemnity Act 1692|public|19|04-11-1692|note3=|repealed=y|archived=n|An Act for preventing Suits against such as acted for Their Majesties Service in Defence of the Kingdom.}}
| {{|Judgment Act 1692|public|20|04-11-1692|note3=|repealed=y|archived=n|An Act for the better discovery of Judgments in the Courts of Kings Bench Common Pleas & Exchequer att Westminster.}}
| {{|Malicious Information in Court of King's Bench Act 1692|public|18|04-11-1692|note3=|repealed=y|archived=n|An Act to prevent malicious Informations in the Court of King's Bench and for the more easie reversal of Outlaries in the same Court.}}
| {{|Militia Act 1692|public|6|04-11-1692|note3=|repealed=y|archived=n|An Act for raising the Militia of this Kingdom for the yeare One thousand six hundred ninety & three although the Months Pay formerly advanced be not repaid.}}
| {{|Mutiny Act 1692|public|13|04-11-1692|note3=|repealed=y|archived=n|An Act for punishing Officers and Soldiers who shall mutiny or desert Therr Majesties Service and for punishing False Musters and for the payment of Quarters.}}
| {{|Pleadings in Actions Act 1692|public|21|04-11-1692|note3=|repealed=y|archived=n|An Act for delivering Declaracions to Prisoners.}}
| {{|Public Accounts Act 1692|public|11|04-11-1692|note3=|repealed=y|archived=n|An Act for examineing takeing and stateing the publick Accompts of this Kingdom.}}
| {{|Repairs of Church Act 1692|public|12|04-11-1692|note3=|repealed=y|archived=n|An Act to make Parishioners of the Church united Contributors to the Repairs and Ornaments of the Church to whome the Union is made.}}
| {{|Special Bail Act 1692|public|4|04-11-1692|note3=|repealed=y|archived=n|An Act for takeing Special Bails in the Countrey upon Actions and Suites depending in the Courts of Kings Bench Common Pleas and Exchequer att Westminster.}}
| {{|Land Tax Act 1692|public|1|04-11-1692|note3=|repealed=y|archived=n|An Act for granting to Their Majesties an Aid of Foure Shillings in the Pound for One yeare for carrying on a vigorous War against France.}}
| {{|Taxation Act 1692 c 5|public|5|04-11-1692|note3=|repealed=y|archived=n|An Act for granting to Their Majesties certain additional Impositions upon several Goods and Merchandize for the prosecuting the present War against France.}}
| {{|Taxation Act 1692 c 14|public|14|04-11-1692|note3=|repealed=y|archived=n|An Act for review of the Quarterly Poll granted to Their Majesties in the last Session of this present Parliament.}}
| {{|Taxation Act 1692 c 15|public|15|04-11-1692|note3=|repealed=y|archived=n|An Act for continueing certain Acts therein mencioned and for chargeing several Joynt Stocks.}}
| {{|Taxation, etc. Act 1692|public|3|04-11-1692|note3=|repealed=y|archived=n|An Act for granting to Their Majesties certain Rates and Duties of Excise upon Beer Ale and other Liquors for secureing certain Recompences and Advantages in the said Act mencioned to such Persons as shall voluntarily advance the Summe of Ten hundred thousand Pounds towards carrying on the War against France.}}
| {{|Trade with France Act 1692|public|25|04-11-1692|note3=|repealed=y|archived=n|An Act for continuing the Acts For prohibiting all Trade and Commerce with France and for the encouragement of Privateers.}}
| {{|Wills Act 1692|public|2|04-11-1692|note3=|repealed=y|archived=n|An Act for that the Inhabitants of the province of York may dispose of their personal Estates by their Wills notwithstanding the Custom of that province.}}
}}

Private Acts
 Abel Atwood's estate: sale of lands for payment of debts and provision for younger children. c. 34
 Abraham Hinde's estate: sale of lands and a messuage for payment of debts. c. 33
 Alexander Popham's estate: jointure for wife and provision for children upon receipt of £12,000 portion to be applied for payment of debts. c. 6
 Anthony Danby's estate: settling a jointure on his wife and making provision for his brothers and younger children and for payment of debts. c. 16
 Anthony Eyre's estate: sale of lands for payment of debts and portions for children. c. 1
 Barnham Powel's estate: settling of manor of Kings North to provide for younger children. c. 11
 Better assurance of manor of Woodlands and Hundred of Knoulton to Edward Seymour. c. 20
 Bishop of Bangor's estate: leasing of Bangor House in St Andrews, Holborn. c. 23
 Confirmation of sale of woodlands in Hampshire and of agreements between Isaac and Richard Wollaston. c. 17
 Division of the chapelries of North Chapel and Dungton from the Parish of Petworth [Sussex] and making them new parishes, and settlement of the advowsons of the rectories of Petworth, North Chapel, Dungton, Clewer, Farnham Royal [Buckinghamshire], Worplesdon [Surrey], Kirby, Overblowes and Catton and the vicarage of Long Horsley [Northumberland]. c. 13
 Enabling Sir George Parker to make a marriage settlement despite his minority. c. 7
 Enabling Sir John Wentworth (an infant) to make a jointure out of and settle his manors and lands in Yorkshire, York and Westmorland. c. 4
 Enabling Sir Thomas Wroth to make a jointure and settlement on his marriage and provision for his sister notwithstanding his minority. c. 15
 Enabling William Wake and William Wake, Doctor in Divinity, to make leases for lives or years within manor of Shapwick (Dorset). c. 8
 Exchange of lands in Fulham belonging to the Bishopric of London for others belonging to Charles Earl of Monmouth. c. 29
 Francis Osbaston's estate: sale of lands and manors for payment of debts and legacies and provision of a portion for his daughter Mary. c. 14
 Henry Baynton's estate: better execution of a trust and provision of a portion for his daughter. c. 18
 Henry Hawley's estate: sale for benefit of his infant daughters. c. 2
 Lincolnshire, Berkshire and Devon estates: clarification of Lincolnshire, Berkshire and Devon estates Act [3 Will. & Mar. c. 33]. c. 3
 Matthew and Robert Pitt's estate: enabling trustees to sell land for payment of debts and settle the remainder on Matthew and Robert Pitt, Robert's wife and their issue. c. 21
 Naturalization of Henry Sheilbell and others. c. 30
 Ralph Macclesfield's estate: sale of land for payment of debts and provision for wife and children. c. 12
 Richard Walthall's estate: sale of land for payment of debts and portions. c. 19
 Roger Price's estate: sale of part for provision of portions for daughters of John Price deceased. c. 26
 Sale of Thomas Broomhall's interest in the office of Warden of the Fleet and in 13 adjoining houses and in an office of the custody and keeping of Westminster palace for the better payment of debts. c. 28
 Settlement and confirmation of manors and lands in Hameldon (Rutlandshire) pursuant to a past agreement for exchanging and inclosing lands there. c. 31
 Settlement of Francis Boyle Viscount Shannon's estate in Ireland. c. 22
 Sir Anthony Browne's estate: more effectual execution of a trust and of a Chancery decree. c. 5
 Sir John Williams' estate: sale of manors of Ewyas Lacy, Waterstone and Trescaillan and other lands in Herefordshire and the manor of Carwent and other lands in Monmouthshire for payment of debts. c. 27
 Sir Robert Smith's estate: sale of lands and settlement of other lands in lieu. c. 32
 Sir William Mannock's estate: charging of estate to raise portions for younger children. c. 10
 Thomas Goodwin's estate: sale of lands for payment of debts and provision for his wife and children. c. 25
 Thomas Towers' estate: vesting manor of Barcroft and other lands in Lincolnshire, Isle of Ely, Cambridgeshire and Norfolk in trustees for payment of debts and provision for his wife and daughter. c. 24
 William Molineux's estate: rectification of a mistake in William Molineux's estate Act 1691 [c. 23]. c. 9

1693 (5 Will. & Mar.)

Public Acts

| {{|Importation Act 1693|public|2|07-11-1693|note3=|repealed=y|archived=n|An Act for repealing such parts of several former Acts as prevent or prohibit the importacion of Forreign Brandy Aqua vite and other Spirits and Bacon except from France.}}

| {{|Importation Act 1693|public|3|07-11-1693|note3=|repealed=y|archived=n|An Act for the importation of fine Italian Sicilian and Naples Thrown Silke.}}

| {{|Justice of the Peace in Wales Act 1693|public|4|07-11-1693|note3=|repealed=y|archived=n|An Act to repeal a Clause in the Statute made in the four and thirtieth and five and thirtieth Years of King Henry the Eighth, by which Justices of Peace in Wales are limitted to Eight in each County.}}

| {{|Government Life Annuities Act 1693|public|5|07-11-1693|note3=|repealed=y|archived=n|An Act to supply the deficiency of the money raised by a former Act entituled An Act for granting to their Majesties certain Rates and Duties of Excise upon Beer Ale and other Liquors for secureing certaine Recompences and Advantages in the said Act mencioned to such persons as shall voluntarily advance the summ of Ten hundred thousand pounds towards carrying on the Warr against France.}}

| {{|Royal Mines Act 1693|public|6|07-11-1693|note3=|repealed=n|archived=n|An Act to prevent Disputes and Controversies concerning Royal Mines.}}

| {{|House of Commons (Disqualification) Act 1693|public|7|07-11-1693|note3=|repealed=y|archived=n|An Act for granting to their Majesties certain Rates and Duties upon Salt and upon Beer, Ale and other Liquors for secureing certaine Recompences and Advantages in the said Act mencioed to such Persons as shall voluntarily advance the summ of Ten hundred thousand Pounds towards carrying on the Warr against France.}}
}}

Private Acts

| {{|James Clayton's estate: indemnifying trustees for sale of lands for payment of debts.|private|2|07-11-1693|note3=|repealed=n|archived=n|}}
}}

1694

5 & 6 Will. & Mar.

Public Acts

| {{|Capiatur Fine Act 1694|public|12|07-11-1693|note3=|repealed=y|archived=n|An Act to take away the Processe for the Capiatur Fine in the several Courts att Westminster.}}
| {{|Cloth Weavers Act 1694|public|9|07-11-1693|note3=|repealed=y|archived=n|An Act for repeal of a Clause in the Statute of the Fifth yeare of Queen Elizabeth (containing diverse Orders for Artificers and others) which relates to Weavers of Cloath.}}
| {{|Duchy of Cornwall Act 1694|public|18|07-11-1693|note3=|repealed=y|archived=n|An Act for enableing theire Majesties to make Grants Leases and Copies of Offices Lands and Hereditaments Parcell of theire Dutchy of Cornwall or annexed to the same and for Confirmacion of Leases and Grants already made.}}
| {{|Exportation Act 1694|public|17|07-11-1693|note3=|repealed=y|archived=n|An Act for the Exportation of Iron, Copper and Mundick Mettal.}}
| {{|Hackney Coaches, etc. Act 1694|public|22|07-11-1693|note3=|repealed=y|archived=n|An Act for the lycenseing and regulateing Hackney-Coaches and Stage-Coaches.}}
| {{|Importation Act 1694|public|16|07-11-1693|note3=|repealed=y|archived=n|An Act for the Importation of Salt-Petre for One Yeare.}}
| {{|Insolvent Debtors Relief Act 1694|public|8|07-11-1693|note3=|repealed=y|archived=n|An Act for the explaining and for the more effectual execution of a former Act for the relief of poor Prisoners.}}
| {{|Militia Act 1694|public|19|07-11-1693|note3=|repealed=y|archived=n|An Act for Raising the Militia of this Kingdom, for the Year One thousand six hundred ninety four, although the Moneths Pay formerly advanced be not repayed.}}
| {{|Mutiny Act 1694|public|15|07-11-1693|note3=|repealed=y|archived=n|An Act for continuing the Act for punishing Officers and Souldiers who shall mutiny or desert their Majesties. Service and for punishing false Musters and for the Payment of Quarters for One Yeare longer.}}
| {{|Navy Act 1694|public|25|07-11-1693|note3=|repealed=y|archived=n|An Act for the better discipline of theire Majesties Navy Royall.}}
| {{|Orphans, London Act 1694|public|10|07-11-1693|note3=|repealed=y|archived=n|An Act for Relief of the Orphans and other Creditors of the City of London.}}
| {{|Pardon of Felony Act 1694|public|13|07-11-1693|note3=|repealed=y|archived=n|An Act to repeal the Statute made in the Tenth yeare of King Edward the Third for finding sureties for the good abearing by him or her that hath a pardon of Felony. |note4= }}
| {{|Public Accounts Act 1694|public|23|07-11-1693|note3=|repealed=y|archived=n|An Act for appointing and enableing Commissioners to examine take and state the Publicke Accompts of the Kingdome.}}
| {{|Quarter Sessions Delays Act 1694|public|11|07-11-1693|note3=|repealed=y|archived=n|An Act to prevent Delays of Proceedings att the Quarter Sessions of the Peace.}}
| {{|Ships Act 1694|public|24|07-11-1693|note3=|repealed=y|archived=n|An Act for building good and defensible Shipps.}}
| {{|Stamps Act 1694|public|21|07-11-1693|note3=|repealed=y|archived=n|An Act for granting to theire Majesties severall Dutyes upon Velum Parchment and Paper for Four Yeares towards carryyng on the warr against France.}}
| {{|Taxation Act 1694|public|14|07-11-1693|note3=|repealed=y|archived=n|An Act for raiseing money by a Poll payable quarterly for One yeare for carrying on a vigorous Warr against France.}}
}}

Private Acts
 Alice Turner's and her children's estate: sale of houses and grounds near Lincoln's Inn Fields. c. 11
 Charles Turner's estate: settlement. c. 13
 Construction of a bridge over the river Axe (Somerset). c. 8
 Enabling Sir Charles Barrington to make a jointure for his wife Dame Bridget and to provide for his children. c. 5
 Enabling the Earl of Thanet and Sackville Tufton to lease Thanet House in St. Botolph, Aldersgate. c. 6
 Erecting new Parish of St. John of Wapping (Middlesex). c. 20
 Estates of Roger and Thomas Whitley in Cheshire: exchange. c. 3
 Henry Frere's estate: sale of part to raise money to recover other parts under water and pay debts. c. 7
 John Whitehall's estate: charging of certain lands for children's portions. c. 9
 Mildmay's and Dixy's estate: sale for payment of debts and mortgages. c. 15
 Nathaniel Brent's estate: sale of part for payment of debts and maintenance of his children. c. 18
 Naturalization of Johanna D'Offerel and others. c. 22
 Payment of George Turner's debts. c. 4
 Payment of the late John Lord Stawell's debts. c. 17
 Sale of a third part of the manor of Lekby and other lands in Yorkshire and settlement of a farm and lands in Terling and Mack Leighs in Essex to the same uses. c. 19
 Sir James Beverly's estate (Huntingdonshire): vesting in trustees for sale. c. 21
 Sir John Maynard's estate: settlement. c. 16
 Susan and Dorothy Chaplyn's estate: sale for payment of debts and provision for themselves. c. 10
 Thomas Edwards' estate: sale of part for payment of debts and disabling him from committing waste on the residue. c. 12
 William Stevens' estate: sale for payment of mortgage and application of the residue for the benefit of his sons. c. 14

6 & 7 Will. & Mar

Public Acts

| {{|Continuance of Acts Act 1694|public|14|12-11-1694|note3=|repealed=y|archived=n|An Act for continuing several Laws therein mentioned.}}
| {{|Duties on Marriages, etc. Act 1694|public|6|12-11-1694|note3=|repealed=y|archived=n|An Act for granting to his Majesty certaine rates and duties upon Marriages Births and Burials and upon Batchelors and Widowers for the terme of Five yeares for carrying on the Warr against France with Vigour.}}
| {{|Exemptions of Apothecaries Act 1694|public|4|12-11-1694|note3=|repealed=y|archived=n|An Act for exempting Apothecaries from serving the offices of Constable Scavenger and other Parish and Ward Offices and from serving upon Juries.}}
| {{|General Pardon Act 1694|public|20|12-11-1694|note3=|repealed=y|archived=n|An Act for the Kings most gracious general and free pardon.}}
| {{|Government Life Annuities Act 1694|public|5|12-11-1694|note3=|repealed=y|archived=n|An Act for enabling such persons as have Estates for life in Annuities payable by several former Acts therein mencioned to purchase and obtaine further or more certaine interests in such Annuities and in default thereof for admitting other persons to purchase or obtaine the same for raiseing moneys for carrying one the Warr against France.}}
| {{|Meeting of Parliament Act 1694|note1=(also known as the Triennial Act 1694)|public|2|12-11-1694|note3=|repealed=n|archived=n|An Act for the frequent Meeting and calling of Parliaments.}}
| {{|Militia, etc. Act 1694|public|13|12-11-1694|note3=|repealed=y|archived=n|An Act for raiseing the Militia of this Kingdome for the Yeare One thousand six hundred ninety five and for repealing the Statute of the Second & Third Yeare of King Edward the Sixth intituled An Act against shooting in Hail-Shot.}}
| {{|Mutiny Act 1694|public|8|12-11-1694|note3=|repealed=y|archived=n|An Act for continuing Two former Acts for punishing Officers and Soldiers who shall mutiny or desert his Majesties service & for punishing false musters and for payment of quarters for one yeare longer.}}
| {{|Newcastle (Sale of Coal by Measured Keel) Act 1694|public|10|12-11-1694|note3=|repealed=y|archived=n|An Act for the better Admeasurement of Keels and Keel-Boats in the Port, of Newcastle & the Members thereunto belonging.}}
| {{|Profane Swearing Act 1694|public|11|12-11-1694|note3=|repealed=y|archived=n|An Act for the more effectuall suppressing prophane Cursing and Swearing.}}
| {{|Public Accounts Act 1694|public|9|12-11-1694|note3=|repealed=y|archived=n|An Act for appointing and enableing Commissioners to examine take and state the Publick Accounts.}}
| {{|Sir Thomas Cooke, etc. (East India Company Transactions) Act 1694|public|19|12-11-1694|note3=|repealed=y|archived=n|An Act for imprisoning Sir Thomas Cook, Sir Bazill Firebrace, Charles Bates Esq. and James Craggs and restraining them from aliening their estates.}}
| {{|Sir Thomas Cooke's Indemnity Act 1694|public|15|12-11-1694|note3=|repealed=y|archived=n|An Act to indempnifie Sir Thomas Cooke from Actions which hee might bee liable to by reason of his discovering to whom hee paid and distributed several summs of money therein mencioned to bee received out of the Treasure of the East-India Company or for any prosecution for such distribution.}}
| {{|Stamps (Amendment) Act 1694|public|12|12-11-1694|note3=|repealed=y|archived=n|An Act for explaineing and regulateing several Doubts Duties and Penalties in the late Act for granting several Duties upon Velum Parchment and Paper and for ascertaineing the Admeasurement of the Tunnage of Ships.}}
| {{|Taxation Act 1694|public|1|12-11-1694|note3=|repealed=y|archived=n|An Act for granting to their Majesties a Subsidy of Tonnage and Poundage and other summs of money payable upon Merchandizes exported and imported.}}
| {{|Taxation Act 1694|public|3|12-11-1694|note3=|repealed=y|archived=n|An Act for granting to his Majestie an Aide of Four shillings in the Pound for One Yeare and for applying the yearely summe of Three hundred thousand Poundes for Five years out of the Dutyes of Tunnage and Poundage and other summes of money payable upon Merchandizes exported and imported for carrying on the Warr against France with vigour.}}
| {{|Taxation Act 1694|public|7|12-11-1694|note3=|repealed=y|archived=n|An Act for granting to his Majestie several additional Duties upon Coffee Tea Chocolate and Spices towards satisfaction of the debts due for Transport Service for the reduction of Ireland.}}
| {{|Taxation Act 1694|public|18|12-11-1694|note3=|repealed=y|archived=n|An Act for granting to his Majestie certaine duties upon glasse wares stone and earthen bottles coals and culme for carrying on the Warr against France.}}
| {{|Thames Navigation Act 1694|public|16|12-11-1694|note3=|repealed=y|archived=n|An Act to prevent Exactions of the Occupiers of Locks and Weares upon the River of Thames westward and for ascertaining the Rates of Water-carriage upon the said River.}}
}}

Private Acts
 Christchurch parish (Surrey): enabling the making of rates to provide a minister and empowering the trustees of John Marshall, deceased, to employ money to finish the church. c. 10
 Confirmation of a grant by the rector of the united parishes of St. Michael Royal and St. Martin's in the Vintrey, London, of part of St. Martin's churchyard. c. 11
 Confirmation of two indentures tripartite, of lease and release, made by Thomas, Earl of Thanett Island, Sackville Tufton, William Cheyne and Sir Charles Tufton, and of the estates thereby settled. c. 6
 Enabling Elizabeth, widow of John Howland, to settle lands upon marriage of his sole daughter and heir; settling lands on Elizabeth for her life in lieu of dower and indemnifying her and Sir Josias Child in disposing of the personal estate of said heir on her preferment in marriage, she being under 21 years old. c. 22
 Enabling Peter Gollop to sell a farm and lands called Wantsly subject to payment of £1000 and interest to the executory estate of Robert Merefield, deceased. c. 27
 Enabling Sir Paul and Dame Jane Whitchott to make leases of manor of Tooting Gravenay and lands in Tooting Gravenay, Tooting Bec and Streatham (Surrey). c. 19
 For settling manors and lands upon the Marquis of Tavistock's marriage. c. 4
 George Gilbert Pierce's estate: vesting in trustees lands and tenements in Middle Temple, London for payment of debts. c. 23
 George Pitt's estate: correction of deed of trust and will. c. 2
 Hannah and Jonathon Woollaston's estate: sale of lands in Warmford (Hampshire) for payment of debts and legacies of Richard Woollaston. c. 29
 Henry Northley's estate: leasing for payment of debts and maintenance for children. c. 12
 James Earl of Salisbury's estate: leasing of Salisbury house and other hereditaments in the Strand (Middlesex) for improvement by building. c. 5
 Jane Rogers' estate: sale of lands for payment of the debts and legacies of Brian Rogers in performance of his will. c. 14
 John Caryle's estate: vesting land in Kent and Sussex in trustees for payment of debts and portions for younger children and for correction of a conveyance. c. 17
 John Estoft's estate: sale of lands and tenements for payment of debts and portions for daughters. c. 13
 John Kirke's estate: sale for payment of debts. c. 28
 John, Earl of Rochester's estate: division and settlement, and discharge of trusts. c. 7
 Jonathon Webb's estate: sale of part for payment of debts and incumbrances. c. 21
 Joseph Finch's estate: sale of lands for better provision of daughters and coheirs. c. 16
 Making saltwater fresh. c. 24
 Naturalization of Bernard Cosserat, Alexander Pringli and others. c. 3
 Ratifying and confirming an indenture of lease of Martin Meare (Lancashire) made by Earl of Derby and others to Thomas Fleetwood. c. 15
 Reversal of the attainder of Jacob Leisler and others. c. 30
 Sale of manors of Earls Croome and Baughton (Worcestershire), settlement of the manor house and royalty of Wainfleet St. Mary (Lincolnshire) to the same uses and enabling Sir Robert Barham to make provision for younger children. c. 8
 Sir Jarvase Clifton's estate: vesting lands in Nottinghamshire in trustees for payment of debts and raising of portions for younger children. c. 9
 Sir Thomas Hare's estate: provision of portions and maintenance for younger children. c. 26
 Sir William Chaitor's estate: sale of land in Yorkshire and Durham for payment of debts and raising of portions for younger children. c. 18
 Warwick fire rebuilding, &c. c. 1
 William Gage's estate: mortgaging for preservation of timber growing thereon. c. 25
 William Wanley's estate: building new messuages and tenements in Ax-yard, King Street, Westminster and enabling his guardian to lease the same. c. 20

1695 (7 & 8 Will. 3)

Public Acts

| {{|Coin Act 1695|public|1|22-11-1695|note3=|repealed=y|archived=n|An Act for remedying the Ill State of the Coin of the Kingdome.}}
| {{|Coinage Act 1695|public|19|22-11-1695|note3=|repealed=y|archived=n|An Act to incourage the bringing Plate into the Mint to be coined and for the further remedying the ill State of the Coine of the Kingdome.}}
| {{|Coining Act 1695|public|13|22-11-1695|note3=|repealed=y|archived=n|An Act for taking off the Obligation and Incouragement for coining Guineas for a certaine time therein mentioned.}}
| {{|Continuance of Acts, 1695|public|36|22-11-1695|note3=|repealed=y|archived=n|An Act for continuing several Acts of Parliament. therein mentioned.}}
| {{|Corrupt Practices Act 1695|public|4|22-11-1695|note3=|repealed=y|archived=n|An Act for preventing Charge and Expence in Elections of Members to serve in Parliament.}}
| {{|Greenland Trade Act 1695|public|33|22-11-1695|note3=|repealed=y|archived=n|An Act for the better Incouragement of the Greenland Trade.}}
| {{|Greenwich Hospital, etc. Act 1695|public|21|22-11-1695|note3=|repealed=y|archived=n|An Act for the Increase and Encouragement of Seamen.}}
| {{|Habeas Corpus Suspension Act 1695|public|11|22-11-1695|note3=|repealed=y|archived=n|An Act for impowering His Majestie to apprehend and detain such p[er]sons as hee shall find Cause to suspect are conspiring against His Royal Person or Government.}}
| {{|Highways Act 1695|public|29|22-11-1695|note3=|repealed=y|archived=n|An Act for the better amending & repairing the High-ways and Explanacion of the Laws relateing thereunto.}}
| {{|Insolvent Debtors Relief Act 1695|public|12|22-11-1695|note3=|repealed=y|archived=n|An Act for Relief of Poor Prisoners for Debt or Damages.}}
| {{|Juries Act 1695|public|32|22-11-1695|note3=|repealed=y|archived=n|An Act for the Ease of Jurors and better regulating of Juries.}}
| {{|Linen Manufacture Act 1695|public|39|22-11-1695|note3=|repealed=y|archived=n|An Act for encourageing the Linen Manufacture of Ireland and bringing Flax and Hemp into and the making of Sail Cloth in this Kingdome.}}
| {{|Marriage Duty Act 1695|public|35|22-11-1695|note3=|repealed=y|archived=n|An Act for the inforcing the Laws which restraine Marriages without Licence or Banns & for the better registring Marriags Births and Burials.}}
| {{|Militia Act 1695|public|16|22-11-1695|note3=|repealed=y|archived=n|An Act for raiseing the Militia of this Kingdom for the Year One thousand six hundred ninety six although the Months Pay formerly advanced bee not repaid.}}
| {{|Mortmain Act 1695|public|37|22-11-1695|note3=|repealed=y|archived=n|An Act for the Encouragement of Charitable Gifts and Dispositions.}}
| {{|Moss Troopers Act 1695|public|17|22-11-1695|note3=|repealed=y|archived=n|An Act to continue Foure former Acts for preventing Theft and Rapine upon the Northerne Borders of England.}}
| {{|Mutiny Act 1695|public|23|22-11-1695|note3=|repealed=y|archived=n|An Act for continueing severall former Acts for punishing Officers and Soldiers who shall Mutiny or Desert His Majesties Service and for punishing False Musters and for Payment of Quarters for One Yeare longer.}}
| {{|Oaths, etc. Act 1695|public|24|22-11-1695|note3=|repealed=y|archived=n|An Act requireing the Practicers of Law to take the Oaths and subscribe the Declaration therein mentioned.}}
| {{|Parliament Act 1695|public|15|22-11-1695|note3=|repealed=y|archived=n|An Act for the continueing meeting and sitting of a Parliament in case of the Death or Demise of His Majesty His Heirs and Successors.}}
| {{|Parliamentary Elections Act 1695|public|25|22-11-1695|note3=|repealed=y|archived=n|An Act for the further regulating Elections of Members to serve in Parliament and for the preventing irregular Proceedings of Sheriffs and other Officers in the electing and returning such Members.}}
| {{|Parliamentary Elections (Returns) Act 1695|public|7|22-11-1695|note3=|repealed=y|archived=n|An Act to prevent False and Double Returns of Members to serve in Parliament.}}
| {{|Plantation Trade Act 1695|public|22|22-11-1695|note3=|repealed=y|archived=n|An Act for preventing Frauds and regulating Abuses in the Plantation Trade.}}
| {{|Public Accounts Act 1695|public|8|22-11-1695|note3=|repealed=y|archived=n|An Act for the taking examining and stating the Publick Accounts.}}
| {{|Quakers Act 1695|public|34|22-11-1695|note3=|repealed=y|archived=n|An Act that the Solemne Affirmation & Declaration of the People called Quakers shall be accepted instead of an Oath in the usual Forme.}}
| {{|Recovery of Small Tithes Act 1695|public|6|22-11-1695|note3=|repealed=y|archived=n|An Act for the more easie Recoverie of Small Tythes.}}
| {{|Rivers Wye and Lugg Act 1695|public|14|22-11-1695|note3=|repealed=y|archived=n|An Act for making navigable the Rivers of Wye and Lugg in the County of Hereford.}}
| {{|Roads, London to Harwich Act 1695|public|9|22-11-1695|note3=|repealed=y|archived=n|An Act for repairing the Highways betweene the City of London and the Towne of Harwich in the County of Essex.}}
| {{|Roads, Norfolk Act 1695|public|26|22-11-1695|note3=|repealed=y|archived=n|An Act for repaireing the High-wayes betweene Wymondham and Attleborough in the County of Norfolk.}}
| {{|Security of King and Government Act 1695|public|27|22-11-1695|note3=|repealed=y|archived=n|An Act for the better Security of His Majesties Royal Person and Government.}}
| {{|Taxation Act 1695|public|5|22-11-1695|note3=|repealed=y|archived=n|An Act for granting to His Majesty an Aid of Four Shillings in the Pound for carrying on the War against France.}}
| {{|Taxation Act 1695|public|10|22-11-1695|note3=|repealed=y|archived=n|An Act for continuing several Duties granted by former Acts upon Wine and Vinegar and upon Tobacco and East India Goods and other Merchandize imported for carrying on the Warr against France.}}
| {{|Taxation Act 1695|public|18|22-11-1695|note3=|repealed=y|archived=n|An Act for granting to His Majesty severall Rates or Duties upon Houses for making good the Deficiency of the clipped Money.}}
| {{|Taxation Act 1695|public|20|22-11-1695|note3=|repealed=y|archived=n|An Act for granting to His Majesty an additionall Duty upon all French Goods and Merchandize.}}
| {{|Taxation, etc. Act 1695|public|30|22-11-1695|note3=|repealed=y|archived=n|An Act for laying several Duties upon Low Wines or Spirits of the first Extraction and for preventing the Frauds and Abuses of Brewers Distillers and other Persons chargeable with the Duties of Excise.}}
| {{|Taxation, etc. Act 1695|public|31|22-11-1695|note3=|repealed=y|archived=n|An Act for continuing to His Majesty certaine Duties upon Salt Glass Wares Stone and Earthen Wares and for granting several Duties upon Tobacco Pipes and other Earthen Wares for carrying on the Warr against France and for establishing a National Land Bank and for taking off the Duties upon Tunnage of Shipps and upon Coals.}}
| {{|Treason Act 1695|public|3|22-11-1695|note3=|repealed=n|archived=n|An Act for regulateing of Tryals in Cases of Treason and Misprision of Treason.}}
| {{|Wills Act 1695|public|38|22-11-1695|note3=|repealed=y|archived=n|An Act to take away the Custome of Wales which hinders persons from disposeing their Personal Estates by their Wills.}}
| {{|Wool Act 1695|public|28|22-11-1695|note3=|repealed=y|archived=n|An Act for the more effectual preventing the Exportacion of Wooll and for the incouraging the Importation thereof from Ireland.}}
}}

Private Acts
 Bluet and John Wallop's (minors) estates: leasing and purchasing other lands. c. 22
 Bristol water supply. c. 31
 Bristol: erection of hospitals and workhouses and better employing the poor. c. 32
 Edmond Warner's estate: sale of part for payment of debts. c. 11
 Empowering Anne, Duchess of Buccleuch and her son James, Earl of Dalkeith to grant leases for improving ground in St. Martins-in-the-Fields (Middlesex). c. 24
 Enabling Anthony Earl of Kent and Henry Grey his son to make a jointure for Henry's wife Jemima. c. 7
 Enabling John Aunger, an infant, and his mother to lease his estate. c. 12
 Enabling Richard Haynes to settle a jointure on his wife and to exchange lands with Thomas Stevens' trustees. c. 10
 Enabling Sir Charles Heron to sell lands for payment of a portion and debts. c. 34
 Enabling Sir Thomas Pope Blount to make a marriage settlement for his oldest son. c. 3
 Enabling Sir Thomas Wagstaffe to raise a portion for Frances his only daughter. c. 35
 Enabling Thomas Stoner, a minor, to make a jointure and settlement of his estate in marriage. c. 5
 Enabling trustees to raise money to construct a wet dock and to improve an estate of the Marquess and Marchioness of Tavistock at Rotherhithe (Surrey). c. 25
 Improvement of a house and ground in Great Queen Street. c. 27
 John Fownes' estate: sale of lands in Devon and settlement of others to the same uses. c. 15
 Joseph Dawson's estate: vesting part in trustees for payment of debts and for provision for maintenance and marriage of his daughters. c. 38
 Lady Katherine Fane's estate: sale of reversion of fee farm rents given to her by her grandfather John Bence. c. 1
 Lord Francis Powlett's estate: provision for younger children. c. 8
 Making towns of Stretton and Princethorpe a separate parish from Wolston (Warwickshire). c. 37
 Manor of Barkhampstead: sale of part for payment of incumbrances and purchase and settlement of other lands. c. 13
 Manor of Madeley (Salop.): vesting in trustees. c. 4
 Naturalization of James Stanhope and others. c. 19
 Naturalization of Salomon Eyme and others. c. 20
 Naturalization of the children of Henry de Nassau Seignior de Auverquerke. c. 14
 Naturalization of William Viscount Tunbridge and other children of Earl of Rochford. c. 26
 Revesting in the King the Honour of Tutbury and Forest of Needwood (Staffordshire) and manors, parks, lands, offices and other profits belonging to them, and vacating certain letters patent. c. 41
 Richard Jones' and Mary Gufford's (minors) personal estate: settling in trustees. c. 30
 Sale of the moiety of manor of Shepton Mallet (Somerset) and a divided moiety of manor of Wells (Somerset) for payment of a mortgage and maintenance of Mary, wife of William Sandes, and her children. c. 36
 Samuel Powell's estate: vesting in trustees for payment of debts. c. 6
 Settlement of lands and rentcharges on the rector of Maidwell church (Northamptonshire) and his successors, and in lieu settling other lands and discharging tithes belonging to the said church according to agreements between the patron and the rector made upon inclosure of lands in Maidwell, and later with the consent of the Ordinary confirmed by a Court of Chancery decree. c. 29
 Sir James Chamberlaine's estate: exchange of lands in common hill or field of Salford (Oxfordshire) for other lands in order to make an inclosure. c. 16
 Sir Nicholas and Sir Lawrence Stoughton's estate: sale for payment of debts and portions for daughters of Sir Nicholas. c. 9
 Sir Robert Sawyer's estate: sale of a messuage in Lincoln's Inn Fields and purchase of other lands and tenements to be settled to the same uses. c. 28
 Sir Thomas Parkyns' estate: sale of lands in Huby and Easingwold in Yorkshire and settlement of others in lieu. c. 2
 Sir William Barkham's estate: sale of lands to pay debts and provide for children. c. 33
 St. James's parish, Westminster: power to raise money to discharge debts incurred in building the church, rectory, vestry and other public works. c. 17
 St. Lawrence Old Jewry (London): ascertaining and settling payment of the impropriate tithes to Balliol College, Oxford and confirming an award concerning the same. c. 18
 Thomas Bigg's and wife's estate: vesting lands in Chislett (Kent) in trustees for payment of debts and provision for children. c. 40
 Thomas Rider's and Christopher Clitherow's estates: exchange of messuages in London for manors of Bilsington and other lands in Kent. c. 21
 William Midford's (an infant) estate: sale of manor of Pespoole (Durham) for payment of debts and incumbrances. c. 23
 William Ridout's (an infant) estate: sale of lands in Horsington (Somerset) for payment of incumbrances and for preserving the residue for him. c. 39

1696 (8 & 9 Will. 3)

Public Acts

| {{|Attainder of Conspirators Act 1696|public|5|20-10-1696|note3=|repealed=y|archived=n|An Act to attaint such of the Persons concerned in the late horrid Conspiracy to assassinate His Majesties Royal Person who are fled from Justice unlesse they render themselves to Justice and for continuing several others of the said Conspirators in Custody.}}
| {{|Attainder of Sir John Fenwick Act 1696|public|4|20-10-1696|note3=|repealed=y|archived=n|An Act to attaint Sir John Fenwick Baronett of High Treason.}}
| {{|Bank of England Act 1696|public|20|20-10-1696|note3=|repealed=y|archived=n|An Act for making good the Deficiencies of several Funds therein mentioned and for enlargeing the Capital Stock of the Bank of England and for raising the Publick Creditt.}}
| {{|Blackwell Hall Act 1696|public|9|20-10-1696|note3=|repealed=y|archived=n|An Act to restore the Markett att Blackwell-Hall to the Clothiers & for regulating the Factors there.}}
| {{|Bridlington Piers, Yorkshire Act 1696|public|29|20-10-1696|note3=|repealed=y|archived=n|An Act for the Repaire of the Peers of Bridlington alias Burlington in the East-Riding of the County of York.}}
| {{|Brokers Act 1696|public|32|20-10-1696|note3=|repealed=y|archived=n|An Act to restraine the Number and ill Practice of Brokers and Stock-Jobbers.}}
| {{|Coin Act 1696|public|26|20-10-1696|note3=|repealed=y|archived=n|An Act for the better preventing the counterfeiting the current Coin of this Kingdom.}}
| {{|Coinage Act 1696|public|1|20-10-1696|note3=|repealed=y|archived=n|An Act for importing and coining Guineas and Halfe-guineas.}}
| {{|Coinage Act 1696|public|2|20-10-1696|note3=|repealed=y|archived=n|An Act for the further remedying the ill State of the Coin of the Kingdome.}}
| {{|Compositions by Debtors Act 1696|public|18|20-10-1696|note3=|repealed=y|archived=n|An Act for Relief of Creditors by making Composition with their Debtors in Case Two Thirds in Number & Value doe agree.}}
| {{|Duty on Tin Act 1696|public|34|20-10-1696|note3=|repealed=y|archived=n|An Act for the lessening the Duty upon Tin and Pewter exported and granting an Equivalent for the same by a Duty upon Druggs.}}
| {{|Escape of Debtors, etc. Act 1696|public|27|20-10-1696|note3=|repealed=y|archived=n|An Act for the more effectual Relief of Creditors in Cases of Escapes & for Preventing Abuses in Prisons and pretended priveledged Places.}}
| {{|Excise Act 1696|public|19|20-10-1696|note3=|repealed=y|archived=n|An Act for repealing a Clause in a former Act relateing to Party Guiles and for the better preventing Frauds and Abuses [in] Brewers and others chargeable with the Duties of Excise.}}
| {{|Greenwich Hospital, etc. Act 1696|public|23|20-10-1696|note3=|repealed=y|archived=n|An Act to enforce the Act for the Encrease and Encouragement of Seamen.}}
| {{|Highways Act 1696|public|16|20-10-1696|note3=|repealed=y|archived=n|An Act for enlargeing Common High-ways.}}
| {{|Highways, Surrey and Sussex Act 1696|public|15|20-10-1696|note3=|repealed=y|archived=n|An Act for repairing the High-way betweene Ryegate in the County of Surrey & Crawley in the County of Sussex.}}
| {{|Juries Act 1696|public|10|20-10-1696|note3=|repealed=y|archived=n|An Act to enable the Returns of Juries as formerly until the First Day of November One thousand six hundred ninety seven.}}
| {{|Lustrings Act 1696|public|36|20-10-1696|note3=|repealed=y|archived=n|An Act for the further Encouragement of the Manufacture of Lustrings and Alamodes within this Realme and for the better preventing the Importation of the same.}}
| {{|Militia Act 1696|public|35|20-10-1696|note3=|repealed=y|archived=n|An Act for raiseing the Militia for the Yeare One thousand six hundred ninety seven although the Months Pay formerly advanced be not repaid.}}
| {{|Mutiny Act 1696|public|13|20-10-1696|note3=|repealed=y|archived=n|An Act for continuing several former Acts for punishing Officers and Soldiers who shall mutiny or desert His Majesties Service and for punishing false Musters and for Payment of Quarters for One Yeare longer.}}
| {{|Partition Act 1696|public|31|20-10-1696|note3=|repealed=y|archived=n|An Act for the easier obtaining Partitions of Lands in Coparcenary Joynt Tenancy & Tenancy in Common.}}
| {{|Paving the Haymarket Act 1696|public|17|20-10-1696|note3=|repealed=y|archived=n|An Act for paving and regulating the Hay-Markett in the p[ar]ish of Saint Martin in the Fields and Saint James within the Liberty of Westminster.}}
| {{|Quarter Sessions Act 1696|public|33|20-10-1696|note3=|repealed=y|archived=n|An Act to make perpetual and more effectual an Act intituled An Act to prevent Delays att the Quarter Sessions of the Peace.}}
| {{|Rebuilding of Saint Paul's and Westminster Abbey Act 1696|public|14|20-10-1696|note3=|repealed=y|archived=n|An Act for the compleating the building and adorning the Cathedral Church of Saint Paul London & for repaireing the Collegiate Church of Saint Peter Westminster.}}
| {{|Receipt of Exchequer Act 1696|public|28|20-10-1696|note3=|repealed=y|archived=n|An Act for the better Observation of the Course anciently used in the Receipt of Exchequer.}}
| {{|Relief of the Poor Act 1696|public|30|20-10-1696|note3=|repealed=y|archived=n|An Act for supplying some Defects in the Laws for the Relief of the Poor of this Kingdome.}}
| {{|Standard of Silver Plate, etc. Act 1696|public|8|20-10-1696|note3=|repealed=y|archived=n|An Act for Incouraging the bringing in wrought Plate to be coined.}}
| {{|Streets, London. Act 1696|public|37|20-10-1696|note3=|repealed=y|archived=n|An Act for explaining and enforcing the Act for paving and cleansing the Streets within the Cities of London and Westminster and Borough of Southwark & weekly Bills of Mortality and Streets adjoyning thereunto & for widening the Street at the South end of London-Bridge.}}
| {{|Tallies for Certain Loans Act 1696|public|3|20-10-1696|note3=|repealed=y|archived=n|An Act to explain that part of the Act passed last Session of Parliament for laying several Duties on Low Wines & Spirits of the first Extraction and for preventing the Frauds and Abuses of Brewers Distillers and other Persons chargeable with the Duties of Excise which relates to the Payment of Tallies & the Interest thereof.}}
| {{|Land Tax Act 1696|public|6|20-10-1696|note3=|repealed=y|archived=n|An Act for granting an Aid to His Majesty as well by a Land Tax as by several Subsidies and other Duties payable for One Yeare.}}
| {{|Taxation Act 1696|public|7|20-10-1696|note3=|repealed=y|archived=n|An Act for granting to His Majesty several Duties upon Paper Vellum and Parchment to encourage the bringing of Plate and hammered Money into the Mints to be coined.}}
| {{|Taxation Act 1696|public|12|20-10-1696|note3=|repealed=y|archived=n|An Act for continuing several additional Impositions upon several Goods and Merchandizes.}}
| {{|Taxation Act 1696|public|21|20-10-1696|note3=|repealed=y|archived=n|An Act for laying a Duty upon Leather for the Terme of Three Yeares and making other Provision for answering the Deficiences as well of the late Duties upon Coals & Culme as for paying the Annuities upon the Lottery and for Lives charged on the Tunage of Ships and the Duties upon Salt.}}
| {{|Taxation Act 1696|public|22|20-10-1696|note3=|repealed=y|archived=n|An Act for granting to His Majesty certain Duties upon Malt Mum Sweets Cyder & Perry as well towards carrying on the Warr against France as for the necessary Occasions of His Majesties Household & other Occasions.}}
| {{|Taxation Act 1696|public|24|20-10-1696|note3=|repealed=y|archived=n|An Act for granting to His Majesty a further Subsidy of Tunnage and Poundage upon Merchandizes imported for the Terme of Two Yeares & Three Quarters & an additional Land Tax for One Yeare for carrying on the Warr against France.}}
| {{|Taxation Act 1696|public|25|20-10-1696|note3=|repealed=y|archived=n|An Act for licensing Hawkers and Pedlars for a further provision for the Payment of the Interest of the Transport Debt for the reducing of Ireland.}}
}}

Private Acts
 Annulment of Hannah Knight's (an infant) marriage settlement and directing her guardianship. c. 27
 Bishop of London and Earl of Nottingham advowsons exchange. c. 6
 Charles Milson's estate: sale of land for payment of debts and legacies and purchase of land for Edward Milson. c. 12
 Crompton Mynors' estate: settlement of manor of Treyagoe (Herefordshire) and other lands and increasing portion of Theodosia his daughter. c. 2
 Edmond Warner's estate: explanation of Edmond Warner's estate Act 1695 [c. 11]. c. 23
 Edward and Mary (his wife) Leigh's estate: sale of manors of Waxham and Horsey and lands in Norfolk and purchase of others. c. 18
 Edward Kerrey's estate in Binoeston (Salop.): vesting in trustees for payment of incumbrances and portions for his children, and confirmation of his marriage settlement. c. 15
 Enabling James Duke of Ormond to raise money by sale of woods and to make leases for lives for payment of debts, encouraging English plantation in Ireland and enabling Charles Earl of Arran to make leases of his estate in Ireland. c. 5
 Enabling Nicholas Goodwin the elder and the younger to sell the manor of Winslow (Buckinghamshire) and to purchase other lands to be settled to the same uses. c. 13
 Enabling Sir Ralph Ashton to rectify an omission in his marriage settlement. c. 8
 For satisfying debts of Francis late Lord Holles. c. 7
 Francis Griffith's estate: sale for payment of debts. c. 9
 Importing goods and merchandise laden in Turkey in ships called "Success" and "Dragon Galley" paying customs as if imported by English ships.1 c. 20
 Jeffery Stockley's estate: sale of lands in Cheshire for payment of debts and provision for his daughter Mary. c. 11
 Mary Savile's (an infant) estate: settlement upon her marriage. c. 10
 Naturalization of John Keyser and others. c. 17
 Naturalization of Lord Agram and others. c. 1
 Oliver Neve's estate: rectification of a defect in Oliver Neve's estate Act 1696 [c. 4]. c. 22
 Oliver Neve's estate: sale of two houses in London and vesting lands in Norfolk to the same uses. c. 4
 Roger Crowle's (a lunatic) estate: vesting part in trustees to raise portions for younger children. c. 24
 Samuel Trotman's estate: sale of lands in Barking, East Ham, West Ham and Woolwich (Kent and Essex ) and settlement of other lands in lieu. c. 25
 Sir John Hotham's estate: sale of manor of Holme and Swanage (Dorset) for discharging a mortgage and paying debts. c. 3
 Speedy payment of the late Sir William Thompson's debts. c. 26
 Thomas Panton's estate: sale of land for payment of debts and a jointure for his wife Mary. c. 16
 William Fallows' (an infant) estate in Cheshire: sale for payment of debts secured by mortgages. c. 21
 William Hamond's marriage settlement: power to sell the manor of Rowling (Kent) comprised in the settlement by mistake. c. 28
 William James' estate: sale of lands for payment of debts and provision for himself and his wife and children. c. 19
 William Melward's estate: vesting lands in Herefordshire in trustees for payment of debts. c. 14

1697 (9 Will. 3)

Public Acts

| {{|Coin Act 1697|public|2|note2=|03-12-1697|note3=|repealed=y|archived=n|An Act to prevent the further Currency of any ham[m]ered Silver Coine of this Kingdome & for recoining such as is now in being and for the making out new Exchequer Bills where the former Bills are or shall be filled upp by Indorsements.|note4=}}

| {{|Bank of England Act 1697|public|3|note2=|03-12-1697|note3=|repealed=y|archived=n|An Act to give further time for the administring of Oaths relating to Talleys & Orders and for the easier dispatch of the Publick Businesse in the Exchequer & in the Bank of England.|note4=}}

| {{|Imprisonment of Certain Traitors Act 1697|public|4|note2=|03-12-1697|note3=|repealed=y|archived=n|An Act for continuing the Imprisonment of Counter and others for the late horrid Conspiracy to assassinate the person of His Sacred Majesty.|note4=}}

| {{|Annuities Act 1697|public|5|note2=|03-12-1697|note3=|repealed=y|archived=n|An Act for satisfying and discharging the Arreares of several Annuities which incurred betweene the Seventeenth Day of May One thousand six hundred ninety six and the Seventeenth Day of May One thousand six hundred ninety seven.|note4=}}

| {{|Sale of Salt Act 1697|public|6|03-12-1697|note3=|repealed=y|archived=n|An Act that all Retailers of Salt shall sell by Weight.}}

| {{|Fireworks Act 1697|public|7|03-12-1697|note3=|repealed=y|archived=n|An Act to prevent the throwing or firing of Squibbs Serpents & other Fire works.}}

| {{|Taxation Act 1697|public|8|03-12-1697|note3=|repealed=y|archived=n|An Act for explaining an Act made the last Session of Parliament for granting to His Majesty certain Duties upon Malt Mum Sweets Cyder & Perry.}}

| {{|Lace Act 1697|public|9|03-12-1697|note3=|repealed=y|archived=n|An Act for rendring the Laws more effectual for preventing the Importation of Forreign Bone-Lace Loom-Lace Needle-work Point & Cutt-work.}}

| {{|Taxation Act 1697|public|10|03-12-1697|note3=|repealed=y|archived=n|An Act for granting to His Majesty the Summ of One Million foure hundred eighty foure thousand & fifteene Pounds one Shilling eleaven Pence three Farthings for disbanding Forces paying Seamen and other Uses therein mencioned.}}

| {{|Poor Act 1697|public|11|03-12-1697|note3=|repealed=y|archived=n|An Act for explaining an Act made the last Session of Parliament. entituled An Act for supplying some Defects in the Laws for the Relief of the Poor of this Kingdome.}}

| {{|Bridgwater, Somerset (Repair of Bridge and Quay) Act 1697|public|12|03-12-1697|note3=|repealed=y|archived=n|An Act for the inlargeing repaireing and preserving the Bridge & Key of the Borough of Bridgewater in the County of Somersett.}}

| {{|Taxation (Coals and Culm) Act 1697|public|13|03-12-1697|note3=|repealed=y|archived=n|An Act for granting to His Majestie several Duties upon Coals and Culm.}}

| {{|Taxation (Coffee, Tea, Chocolate and Spices) Act 1697|public|14|03-12-1697|note3=|repealed=y|archived=n|An Act for continuing the Duties upon Coffee Tea and Chocolate and Spices towards Satisfaction of the Debt due for Transport Service for the Reduction of Ireland.}}

| {{|Arbitration Act 1697|public|15|03-12-1697|note3=|repealed=y|archived=n|An Act for determining Differences by Arbitration.}}

| {{|Court of Marches of Wales Act 1697|public|16|03-12-1697|note3=|repealed=y|archived=n|An Act to execute Judgements & Decrees saved in a Clause in an Act of the First Yeare of the Reigne of King William and Queen Mary intituled An Act for taking away the Court holden before the President and Council of the Marches of Wales.}}

| {{|Bill of Exchange Act 1697|public|17|03-12-1697|note3=|repealed=y|archived=n|An Act for the better Payment of Inland Bills of Exchange.}}

| {{|Gloucestershire Roads Act 1697|public|18|03-12-1697|note3=|repealed=y|archived=n|An Act for repairing the Highways from the Towne of Birdlipp and the Top of Crickley Hill in the County of Gloucester to the City of Gloucester.}}

| {{|Navigation, Colchester to Wivenhoe Act 1697|public|19|03-12-1697|note3=|repealed=y|archived=n|An Act for cleansing & making Navigable the Channel from the Hithe att Colchester to Wivenhoe.}}

| {{|Naturalization (Persons Born Abroad During the War) Act 1697|public|20|03-12-1697|note3=|repealed=y|archived=n|An Act to naturalize the Children of such Officers and Souldiers & others the natural borne Subjects of this Realme who have been borne abroad during the Warr the Parents of such Children haveing been in the Service of this Government.}}

| {{|Coin Act 1697|public|21|03-12-1697|note3=|repealed=y|archived=n|An Act for the better preventing the counterfeiting clipping and other Diminishing the Coine of this Kingdome.}}

| {{|Malt Act 1697|public|22|03-12-1697|note3=|repealed=y|archived=n|An Act to repeale an Act made in the Nine and thirtieth Yeare of the Reigne of Queen Elizabeth intituled (An Act to restraine the excessive makeing of Malt) and to discharge & vacate Orders made by Justices of Peace by virtue thereof for restraining Malsters from making Malt.}}

| {{|Civil List Act 1697|public|23|03-12-1697|note3=|repealed=y|archived=n|An Act for granting to His Majesty a further Subsidy of Tunnage and Poundage towards raiseing the Yearly Summ of Seven hundred thousand Pounds for the Service of His Majesties. Household & other Uses therein mencioned during His Majesties Life.}}

| {{|Annuities Act 1697|public|24|03-12-1697|note3=|repealed=y|archived=n|An Act for inlarging the time for purchasing certain Estates or Interests in several Annuities therein mentioned.}}

| {{|Stamps Act 1697|public|25|03-12-1697|note3=|repealed=y|archived=n|An Act for granting to His Majesty His Heires & Successors further Duties upon Stampt Vellum Parchment. & Paper.}}

| {{|Trade with Africa Act 1697|public|26|03-12-1697|note3=|repealed=y|archived=n|An Act to settle the Trade to Africa.}}

| {{|Hawkers Act 1697|public|27|03-12-1697|note3=|repealed=y|archived=n|An Act for licensing Hawkers and Pedlars for a further Provision of Interest for the Transport Debt for reduceing of Ireland.}}

| {{|Exportation (Silver) Act 1697|public|28|03-12-1697|note3=|repealed=y|archived=n|An Act for the exporting Watches Sword-hilts and other Manufactures of Silver. [Chapter XXVIII. Rot. Parl. 9 Gul.III.p.5.n.4]}}

| {{|Composition by Debtors (Repeal) Act 1697|public|29|03-12-1697|note3=|repealed=y|archived=n|An Act to repeal the Act made the last Session of Parliament intituled "An Act for Relief of Creditors by making Composition with their Debtors in case Two thirds in Number and Value do agree."}}

| {{|Taxation (Lustrings and Alamodes) Act 1697|public|30|03-12-1697|note3=|repealed=y|archived=n|An Act for increasing His Majesties Duties upon Lustrings and Alamodes.}}

| {{|Militia Act 1697|public|31|03-12-1697|note3=|repealed=y|archived=n|An Act for raising the Milita for the Year One thousand six hundred ninety eight although the Months Pay formerly advanced be not paid.}}

| {{|Duties on Marriages etc. Act 1697|public|32|03-12-1697|note3=|repealed=y|archived=n|An Act for preventing Frauds and Abuses in the charging collecting & paying the Duties upon Marriages Births Burials Batchellors and Widowers.}}

| {{|New Forest Act 1697|public|33|03-12-1697|note3=|repealed=y|archived=n|An Act for the increase and preservation of timber in the New Forest in the County of Southampton.}}

| {{|Appropriation of Certain Moneys Act 1697|public|34|03-12-1697|note3=|repealed=y|archived=n|An Act for applying to the Use of His Majesties Navy and Ordnance the Overplus of the Money and Stores which were provided for the building Seven and twenty Ships of War.}}

| {{|Blasphemy Act 1697|public|35|03-12-1697|note3=|repealed=y|archived=n|An Act for the more effectual suppressing of Blasphemy and Profaneness.}}

| {{|Coinage Act 1697|public|36|03-12-1697|note3=|repealed=y|archived=n|An Act to stop the coining Farthings and Halfpence for One Year.}}

| {{|Payment of Lottery Tickets Act 1697|public|37|03-12-1697|note3=|repealed=y|archived=n|An Act for the better and more orderly Payment of the Lottery Tickets now payable out of certain additional Duties of Excise and of other Annuities lately payable out of Tunnage Duties.}}

| {{|Taxation Act 1697|public|38|03-12-1697|note3=|repealed=y|archived=n|An Act for granting to His Majesty an Aid by a Quarterly Poll for One Year.}}

| {{|Silver and Gold Thread Act 1697|public|39|03-12-1697|note3=|repealed=y|archived=n|An Act for settling and adjusting the Proportion of Fine Silver Silk for the better making of Silver and Gold Thread and to prevent the Abuses of Wire-Drawers.}}

| {{|Exportation Act 1697|public|40|03-12-1697|note3=|repealed=y|archived=n|An Act for the Explanation and better Execution of former Acts made against Transportation of Wool Fullers Earth and Scouring Clay.|note4= }}

| {{|Embezzlement of Public Stores Act 1697|public|41|03-12-1697|note3=|repealed=y|archived=n|An Act for the better preventing the imbezlement of His Majesties Stores of War and preventing Cheats Frauds and Abuses in paying Seamens Wages.}}

| {{|Registering of Ships Act 1697|public|42|03-12-1697|note3=|repealed=y|archived=n|An Act for enlarging the Time for Registring of Ships pursuant to the Act for preventing Frauds and regulating Abuses in the Plantation Trade.}}

| {{|Lustrings Act 1697|public|43|03-12-1697|note3=|repealed=y|archived=n|An Act for the better Incouragement of the Royal Lustring Company and the more effectual preventing the fraudulent Importation of Lustrings and Alamodes.}}

| {{|East India Company Act 1697|public|44|03-12-1697|note3=|repealed=y|archived=n|An Act for raising a Sum not exceeding Two Millions upon a Fund for Payment of Annuities...and for settling the Trade to the East Indies.}}

| {{|Taxation (Whale Fins and Scotch Linen) Act 1697|public|45|03-12-1697|note3=|repealed=y|archived=n|An Act for taking away Half the Duties imposed on Glass Wares and the Whole Duties lately laid on Stone and Earthen Wares and Tobacco Pipes and for granting (in lieu thereof) new Duties upon Whale Fins and Scotch Linen.}}
}}

Private Acts

}}
 Annexing the rectory of Whitbourne (Herefordshire) to the Bishopric of Hereford. c. 24
 Bishopric of Chichester: enabling the Bishop of Chichester to grant leases of property in Chancery Lane. c. 12
 Charles, Earl of Macclesfield's divorce and making illegitimate the children of Anne his wife. c. 11
 City and County of the City of Exon [Exeter]: erection of hospitals and workhouses for better employing and maintaining the poor. c. 33
 City of Hereford: erection of hospitals and workhouses for better employing and maintaining the poor. c. 34
 Colchester: erection of hospitals and workhouses for better employing and maintaining the poor. c. 37
 Confirmation of a lease granted by Bishop of Winton [Winchester] of a parcel of wasteground in Alverstoke (Hampshire) for constructing and improving waterworks there. c. 41
 Confirmation of conveyance by George Pitt and others of manor of Tarrant Preston and other lands in Dorset to John Pitt. c. 45
 Confirming and establishing the administration of Sir William Godolphin's goods and chattels. c. 19
 Correction of a conveyance concerning Sir Edward and Charles Turner's estate. c. 26
 Diana Cecill's and others' estate: vesting lands and hereditaments in Maidstone and elsewhere in Kent in trustees. c. 44
 Enabling Humphrey Trafford to raise £4000 on his estate for payment of debts. c. 62
 Enabling John Lewin to sell certain messuages in Southwark for payment of debts. c. 10
 Enabling Paris Slaughter, William Druce and Dame Elizabeth Chapman to import several bales of Italian silk. c. 30
 Enabling Rebecca Lassels to sell copyhold lands and houses in Ealing (Middlesex). c. 5
 Enabling Simon Lord Bishop of Ely and successors to lease Downham manor house and lands and confirming a recent lease thereof by the Bishop and clearing him and others from dilapidations. c. 2
 Enabling Streynsham Master to sell lands in Kent and to convey lands in Derbyshire to the same uses. c. 29
 Enabling Thomas Kinnersly, an infant, to make a jointure and settlement of his estate. c. 8
 Erection of Crediton (Devon) hospitals, workhouses and houses of correction and better relief of the poor. c. 17
 Erection of Tiverton (Devon) hospitals and workhouses for better employment and maintenance of the poor. c. 18
 Estates of Sir Edward and Hopton Wyndham (both deceased): enabling trustees to make leases, grant copies and receive the rents and profits during the minority of Sir William Wyndham. c. 61
 Freedom of "Sally Rose" (formerly prize) to unload and to trade as an English built ship. c. 59
 Freedom of ships "Panther", "Gloucester", "Frigott", "Scarborough" and "Antelope" (formerly prize and condemned) to trade as English built ships. c. 51
 Freedom of ships "Ruby Prize" and "Plymouth" to trade as English built ships. c. 53
 George Farrington's estate: sale of lands in Middlesex and Surrey, settled upon the marriage of William Farrington his nephew, and purchase of others in Lancashire. c. 6
 George Hewett's estate: sale of lands in Middlesex and purchase of others in Leicestershire to be settled to the same uses. c. 22
 Humphrey Walrond's estate: sale of part for provision for two lunatic children, payment of debts and portions for other children. c. 58
 John Hall's (a lunatic) estate: settling subject to a debt charged thereon. c. 16
 John Hawkes' estate: sale of land in Salop. for payment of debts. c. 57
 John Houghton's estate: sale of manors of Bastwick and Laviles (Norfolk) for payment of debts and settlement of another estate in lieu. c. 28
 John Jenkin's estate: sale of part for payment of debts. c. 56
 John Lewin's estate: correction of the Act of 1697 [c. 10] [sale of certain messuages in Southwark for payment of debts]. c. 35
 Joseph Smith's estate: sale of three houses in Swan Alley in Coleman Street, London, for payment of debts. c. 55
 Kingston-upon-Hull: construction of workhouses and houses of correction. c. 47
 Naturalization of Charles May. c. 13
 Naturalization of Dudley Vesey. c. 9
 Naturalization of Gerrard Maesacker and others. c. 4
 Naturalization of Hillary Reneu and others. c. 50
 Naturalization of John Francis Fauquire, Joseph Ducasse and others. c. 20
 Naturalization of Peter Garon and others. c. 49
 Naturalization of William Lloyd and others. c. 38
 Newcastle upon Tyne water supply. c. 46
 Nicholas Cary's estate: vesting in trustees a moiety of certain messuages and lands in Hackney (Middlesex) for Susanna Cary his widow and relict. c. 36
 Rectification of a mistake in William Gardner's marriage settlement. c. 14
 Relief of Edward Backwell's creditors. c. 43
 Robert Mascall's estate: vesting a copperas work in trustees for sale for payment of debts. c. 54
 Robert Smith's estate: sale of land for payment of debts. c. 27
 Settling certain lands in Essex on Thomas Burgh and his heirs in lieu of other lands conveyed by him according to the decree and will of Sir Samuel Jones. c. 31
 Settling of Viscount and Viscountess Lisburne's estates in Ireland. c. 25
 Shaftesbury: construction of workhouses and houses of correction for better employment and maintenance of the poor. c. 48
 Sir Coppleston Bampfylde's estate: making and renewal of leases during the minority of him and his brother John Bampfylde. c. 15
 Sir Francis and Dame Isabella Guybon's estate: sale of manor of Avenalls and lands in or near Gunthorpe (Norfolk) and settlement of other lands in lieu. c. 3
 Sir John Churchill's estate: confirmation of sale of part pursuant to his will and two Chancery decrees. c. 39
 Sir Ralph Hare's estate: settlement, making a jointure and raising portions and maintenances for his younger children. c. 21
 Sir William Walter's estate: securing portions for his children by Lady Mary, his second wife, and preventing doubts concerning the construction of the articles and will mentioned in them. c. 42
 Thomas Davies estate: sale of certain customary messuages and lands within manor of Gillingham (Dorset) for payment of debts. c. 32
 Vesting in Sydenham Baker a certain rent, messuages and lands in Devon and securing to John and Henry Baker money in lieu of their claims to them. c. 1
 Vesting in Thomas Rogers the manor of Westcourt and lands in Kent and securing to John Higgens and Alice his wife, and for portions for Irene, Margerett, Mary and Alice Cesar, money in lieu of their claims. c. 60
 Vesting the manor of Alveston and lands in Gloucestershire in trustees to be sold for payment of debts and other purposes. c. 40
 William Knott's estate: sale of a lease of houses in Bread Street, London, for payment of debts, and settlement of another estate in lieu. c. 7
 Wriothesly Baptist late Earl of Gainesborough's estate: sale of lands for payment of debts. c. 23

1698

10 Will. 3

Public Acts

| {{|Buttons Act 1698|public|2|01-02-1699|note3=|repealed=y|archived=n|An Act to prevent the makeing or selling Buttons made of Cloth Serge Drugget or other Stuffs. |note4= }}

| {{|Exportation Act 1698 c 3|public|3|01-02-1699|note3=|repealed=y|archived=n|An Act to prohibit the Exportation of any Corn Malt Meale Flour Bread Biscuit or Starch for One Yeare from the Tenth Day of February One thousand six hundred ninety eight.|note4= }}

| {{|Distillation Act 1698|public|4|24-03-1699|note3=|repealed=y|archived=n|An Act to prohibit the excessive distilling of Spirits and Low Wines from Corne and against the Exporting of Beer and Ale and to prevent Frauds in Distillers.}}

| {{|Great Yarmouth Haven and Pier Duties Act 1698|public|5|24-03-1699|note3=|repealed=y|archived=n|An Act for the clearing repairing preserving and maintaining the Haven and Piers of Great Yarmouth in the County of Norfolke.}}

| {{|Russia Company (Membership) Act 1698|public|6|24-03-1699|note3=|repealed=y|archived=n|An Act to enlarge the Trade to Russia.}}

| {{|Parliamentary Elections Act 1698|public|7|24-03-1699|note3=|repealed=y|archived=n|An Act for preventing irregular Proceedings of Sheriffs and other Officers in making the Returns of Members chosen to serve in Parliament.}}

| {{|River Tone: Navigation Act 1698|public|8|24-03-1699|note3=|repealed=y|archived=n|An Act for makeing and keeping the River Tone navigable from Bridgwater to Taunton in the County of Somersett.}}

| {{|Land Tax Act 1698|public|9|04-05-1699|note3=|repealed=y|archived=n|An Act for granting to His Majesty the Summ of One Million four hundred eighty four thousand and fifteene one Shilling eleaven Pence three Farthings for disbanding the Army providing for the Navy and for other necessary Occasions.|note4= }}

| {{|Taxation Act 1698|public|10|04-05-1699|note3=|repealed=y|archived=n|An Act for laying further Duties upon Sweets and for lessening the Duties aswell upon Vineger as upon certaine Low Wines and Whalefins and the Duties upon Brandy imported and for the more easie raising the Duties upon Leather and for charging Cynders and for permitting the Importation of Pearl Ashes and for preventing Abuses in the brewing of Beere and Ale and Frauds in Importation of Tobacco.|note4= }}

| {{|Taxation (Rock Salt) Act 1698|public|11|04-05-1699|note3=|repealed=y|archived=n|An Act for the more full and effectual charging of the Duties upon Rock-Salt.|note4= }}

| {{|Clerks of Assize (Fees) Act 1698|public|12|04-05-1699|note3=|repealed=y|archived=n|An Act for the better apprehending prosecuting and punishing of Felons that commit Burglary Housebreaking or Robbery in Shops Ware-houses Coach-houses or Stables or that steal Horses.}}

| {{|Billingsgate, etc. Act 1698|public|13|04-05-1699|note3=|repealed=y|archived=n|An Act for making Billingsgate a Free Market for Sale of Fish.}}

| {{|Trade to Newfoundland Act 1698|public|14|04-05-1699|note3=|repealed=y|archived=n|An Act to Incourage the Trade to Newfoundland.|note4= }}

| {{|Sedgmoor Drainage Act 1698|public|15|04-05-1699|note3=|repealed=y|archived=n|An Act for opening the ancient and makeing any New Roynes and Water Courses in and neare Sedgmore in the County of Somerset for rendring the said Moor more healthfull and profitable to the Inhabitants.}}

| {{|Wool Act 1698|public|16|04-05-1699|note3=|repealed=y|archived=n|An Act to prevent the Exportation of Wool out of the Kingdoms of Ireland and England into Forreigne parts and for the Incouragement of the Woollen Manufactures in the Kingdom of England.}}

| {{|Exercise of Trades Act 1698|public|17|04-05-1699|note3=|repealed=y|archived=n|An Act to enable such Officers and Soldiers as have been in His Majesties Service during the late Warr to exercise Trades and for Officers to account with their Soldiers.|note4= }}

| {{|Militia Act 1698|public|18|04-05-1699|note3=|repealed=y|archived=n|An Act for raising the Militia for the Yeare One thousand six hundred ninety nine although the Months Pay formerly advanced be not repaid.|note4= }}

| {{|Imprisonment of Certain Traitors Act 1698|public|19|04-05-1699|note3=|repealed=y|archived=n|An Act for the continuing the Imprisonment of Counter and others for the late horrid Conspiracy to assassinate the Person of His Sacred Majesty.|note4= }}

| {{|Reversal of Fines and Recoveries, etc. Act 1698|public|20|04-05-1699|note3=|repealed=y|archived=n|An Act for limiting certaine times within which Writts of Error shall be brought for the reversing Fines Common Recoveries and ancient Judgments.}}

| {{|Recovery of Tithes Act 1698|public|21|04-05-1699|note3=|repealed=y|archived=n|An Act for continueing the Act for the more easie Recovery of Small Tythes.|note4= }}

| {{|Posthumous Children Act 1698|public|22|04-05-1699|note3=|repealed=y|archived=n|An Act to enable Posthumus Children to take Estates as if borne in their Fathers Life time.}}

| {{|Suppression of Lotteries Act 1698|public|23|04-05-1699|note3=|repealed=y|archived=n|An Act for suppressing of Lotteries.}}

| {{|Duties on Glass Repeal Act 1698|public|24|04-05-1699|note3=|repealed=y|archived=n|An Act for takeing off the remaining Duties upon Glasse Wares.|note4= }}

| {{|Aire and Calder Navigation Act 1698|public|25|04-05-1699|note3=|repealed=y|archived=n|An Act for the makeing and keeping navigable the Rivers of Aire and Calder in the County of Yorke.}}

| {{|River Trent Navigation Act 1698|public|26|04-05-1699|note3=|repealed=y|archived=n|An Act for makeing and keeping the River Trent in the River Trent in the Counties of Leicester Derby and Stafford navigable.}}
}}

Private Acts

| {{|Naturalization of Elizabeth Farewell.|private|2|01-02-1699|note3=|repealed=n|archived=n|An Act for naturalizing Elizabeth Farewell.}}

| {{|Naturalization of Nicholas Lepell.|private|3|01-02-1699|note3=|repealed=n|archived=n|An Act for naturalizing Nicholas Lepell.}}

| {{|Naturalization of Bartholomew Ogilby and others.|private|4|01-02-1699|note3=|repealed=n|archived=n|An Act for naturalizing Bartholomew Ogilvy and others.}}

| {{|Freedom of ships "Margaret" and "Friendship" of Bristol.|private|5|24-03-1699|note3=|repealed=n|archived=n|An Act for the Ships Margaret and Friendship, of Bristoll, to trade as free Ships.}}

| {{|Naturalization of James St. Pierre, John Denty and Remond Hensbergh.|private|6|24-03-1699|note3=|repealed=n|archived=n|An Act to naturalize James St. Pierre, John Denty, and Remond Hensbergh.}}

| {{|Naturalization of Charles de Siburg and Francis St. George.|private|7|24-03-1699|note3=|repealed=n|archived=n|An Act to naturalize Charles de Sibourg and Francis St. George.}}

| {{|Naturalization of William de Witt and Godfrey Lloyd.|private|8|24-03-1699|note3=|repealed=n|archived=n|An Act to naturalize William Lloyd, Cornelius de Witt, and Godfrey Lloyd.}}

| {{|Naturalization of John Meoles.|private|9|24-03-1699|note3=|repealed=n|archived=n|An Act to naturalize John Meoles.}}

| {{|Relief of Sir Robert Vyner's creditors.|private|10|24-03-1699|note3=|repealed=n|archived=n|An Act for the Relief of the Creditors of Sir Robert Vyner Knight and Baronet, deceased.}}

| {{|Naturalization of Theophilus Rabesineres and others.|private|11|24-03-1699|note3=|repealed=n|archived=n|An Act for the Naturalization of Theophilus Rabesineres and others.}}

| {{|George Penne's estate: sale of land for payment of debts.|private|12|24-03-1699|note3=|repealed=n|archived=n|An Act for the enabling George Penne Esquire to sell Lands, for the Payment of Debts, and other Purposes therein mentioned.}}

| {{|Naturalization of Philip de Chenevix and others.|private|13|24-03-1699|note3=|repealed=n|archived=n|An Act to naturalize Philip Chenevix and others.}}

| {{|Naturalization of William Lower, William Darnell and Peter Godby.|private|14|24-03-1699|note3=|repealed=n|archived=n|An Act to naturalize William Lower, William Darnell, and Peter Godby.}}

| {{|Naturalization of Anthony Columbiere and others.|private|15|24-03-1699|note3=|repealed=n|archived=n|An Act for naturalizing Anthony Coulombiere and others.}}

| {{|Naturalization of George Burnett.|private|16|24-03-1699|note3=|repealed=n|archived=n|An Act to naturalize George Burnett.}}

| {{|Naturalization of Mark De Moncall and David Loches.|private|17|24-03-1699|note3=|repealed=n|archived=n|An Act to naturalize Marke Anthony Davesseins de Moncall and David Loches.}}

| {{|Naturalization of John Francis De Carcassonet and others.|private|18|24-03-1699|note3=|repealed=n|archived=n|An Act for the Naturalization of John Francis de Carcassonet and others.}}

| {{|Naturalization of Captain Thomas Browne and others.|private|19|24-03-1699|note3=|repealed=n|archived=n|An Act for naturalizing Captain Thomas Browne and others.}}

| {{|Naturalization of John de Philip and others.|private|20|24-03-1699|note3=|repealed=n|archived=n|An Act to naturalize John de Philiponeau Sieur de Montargier, and others.}}

| {{|Naturalization of Peter Barailleau and others.|private|21|24-03-1699|note3=|repealed=n|archived=n|An Act for naturalizing Peter Barailleau and others.}}

| {{|Freedom of ship "Charles," flyboat of Exeter.|private|22|24-03-1699|note3=|repealed=n|archived=n|An Act for the Ship Charles Flyboate, of Exeter, to trade as a free Ship.}}

| {{|Naturalization of Isaac Gouyquette de St. Eloy.|private|23|24-03-1699|note3=|repealed=n|archived=n|An Act to naturalize Isaac Gouyquett D'St. Eloy.}}

| {{|Settlement of augmentations on certain vicarages forever.|private|24|04-05-1699|note3=|repealed=n|archived=n|An Act for settling Augmentations on certain Vicarages for ever.}}

| {{|Confirming grant and settlement by William Forster of manors and lands in Durham and Northumberland to Thomas Lord Fairfax and others upon certain trusts.|private|25|04-05-1699|note3=|repealed=n|archived=n|An Act for the confirming of a Grant and Settlement, made by William Forster Esquire, of divers Manors and Lands, in the County Palatine of Durham, and County of Northumberland, to Thomas Lord Fairfax and others, upon certain Trusts and Uses therein mentioned.}}

| {{|Sir Thomas Darcy's estate: sale of part for payment of debts.|private|26|04-05-1699|note3=|repealed=n|archived=n|An Act for Sale of some Part of the Estate of Sir Thomas Darcey deceased, for Payment of Debts.}}

| {{|Edward Price's estates: transfer of a charge of £1,000 from an estate in Montgomeryshire to one in Herefordshire and Radnorshire for use of his younger children.|private|27|04-05-1699|note3=|repealed=n|archived=n|An Act to enable Edward Price Esquire to transfer a Charge of One Thousand Pounds, for the Use of his Younger Children, from an Estate in the County of Montgomery, to an Estate in the Counties of Hereford and Radnor, of better Value.}}

| {{|George Scott's estate: sale of part for payment of debts and portions for siblings and settlement of the other part.|private|28|04-05-1699|note3=|repealed=n|archived=n|An Act to enable Trustees to sell Part of the Estate of George Scott Esquire, to pay Debts, and raise Portions for his Brothers and Sister; and to settle other Part of his Estate.}}

| {{|Dudley Vesey's estate in Hintlesham (Suffolk): sale for payment of debts.|private|29|04-05-1699|note3=|repealed=n|archived=n|An Act for Sale of the Estate of Dudley Vesey, in Hintlesham, in the County of Suffolk, for the Payment of his Debts.}}

| {{|Robert Aldworth and his wife's estate in or near Wantage (Berkshire): sale for payment of debts and purchase of another for use of wife and children.|private|30|04-05-1699|note3=|repealed=n|archived=n| An Act to enable Robert Aldworth and his Wife to sell their Estate, in or near Wantage, in the County of Berks, for raising Three Hundred Pounds, for Payment of his Debts; and for applying the Residue of the Money for purchasing some other Estate, for the sole Use of his Wife and Children.}}

| {{|Encouraging Thomas Savery's invention for raising water and relating to all sorts of mill work.|private|31|04-05-1699|note3=|repealed=n|archived=n|An Act for the Encouragement of a new Invention by Thomas Savery, for raising Water, and occasioning Motion to all Sorts of Mill-work, by the impellent Force of Fire.}}

| {{|Naturalization of Scipio Guy and others.|private|32|04-05-1699|note3=|repealed=n|archived=n|An Act to naturalize Scipio Guy and others.}}

| {{|John Moor's estate: sale of manors of Halwill and Becket (Devon) for payment of debts.|private|33|04-05-1699|note3=|repealed=n|archived=n|An Act for the Sale of the Manors of Halwill and Beckett, in the County of Devon, the Estate of John Moor, for Payment of Debts.}}

| {{|Thomas Lascells' estate: sale for payment of debts.|private|34|04-05-1699|note3=|repealed=n|archived=n|An Act for vesting the Real Estate late of Thomas Lascells Esquire deceased, in Trustees, to be sold, for the Payment of his Debts.}}

| {{|John Young's estate: sale of lands for payment of debts and legacies.|private|35|04-05-1699|note3=|repealed=n|archived=n|An Act to enable John Young Gentleman to sell Lands, for Payment of Debts and Legacies.}}

| {{|Enabling Liverpool to build and endow a church and making the town and liberties a distinct parish from Walton.|private|36|04-05-1699|note3=|repealed=n|archived=n|An Act to enable the Town of Liverpool, in the County Palatine of Lancaster, to build a Church, and endow the same; and for making the said Town and Liberties thereof a Parish of itself, distinct from Walton.}}

| {{|Thomas and Rowland Okeover's estate: making a jointure and settlement on Thomas' marriage.|private|37|04-05-1699|note3=|repealed=n|archived=n|An Act to enable Thomas Okeover Gentleman, Son and Heir Apparent of Rowland Okeover, of Okeover, in the County of Stafford, Esquire, together with the said Rowland Okeover, to make a Jointure and Settlement upon the Marriage of the said Thomas Okeover.}}

| {{|Enabling Katherine Leeke, an infant, to settle her estate on her marriage.|private|38|04-05-1699|note3=|repealed=n|archived=n|An Act to enable Katherine Leeke, an Infant under the Age of One and Twenty Years, to settle and dispose of her Estate upon her Marriage.}}

| {{|Sir Thomas Seyliard's estate: sale of lands in Kent for payment of sisters' portions.|private|39|04-05-1699|note3=|repealed=n|archived=n|An Act for vesting certain Lands of Sir Thomas Seyliard Baronet, in the County of Kent, in Trustees, to be sold, for the Payment of his Sisters Portions charged thereon.}}

| {{|Enabling Thomas Byde (an infant) to contract for buying his mother's jointure and to settle a small estate in Great Amwell (Hertfordshire) and for securing and raising a portion for Barbara Byde, his sister.|private|40|04-05-1699|note3=|repealed=n|archived=n|An Act to enable Thomas Byde Esquire (an Infant, with the Consent of his Guardians and next Relations) to make a Contract for the buying in of his Mother's Jointure; and to sell a small Estate in Great Amwell, in the County of Hertford; and likewise for the securing and raising a Portion for Barbara Byde, Sister of the said Thomas Byde, and for other Purposes in the Act mentioned.}}

| {{|Sale of manor of Lordington and Whitney and other lands in Sussex and laying out £5,000 to purchase other lands.|note1=|private|41|04-05-1699|note3=|repealed=n|archived=n|An Act for Sale of the Manor of Lordington, alias Lurtington, and Whitway, and divers Lands in the County of Sussex; and for laying out Five Thousand Pounds in purchasing other Lands, to be settled in Lieu thereof.}}

| {{|Samuel Wake or Jones' estate: sale of lands for payment of debts and purchase of lands adjoining the manor of Waltham Holy Cross (Essex).|private|42|04-05-1699|note3=|repealed=n|archived=n|An Act to enable Samuel Wake, alias Jones, Esquire, to sell Lands, to pay Debts; and to purchase other Lands adjoining to, and formerly Parcel of, the Manor of Waltham, alias Waltham Holy-Cross, in the County of Essex, to be settled to the same Uses.}}

| {{|Ann Bridges' (an infant) estate: sale of an estate in Bermuda and laying out in England the proceeds for her use.|private|43|04-05-1699|note3=|repealed=n|archived=n|An Act for the vesting and settling the Estate of Anne Bridges, an Infant, in Bermudas, alias The Summer Istands, in America, in and upon Trustees, to be sold; and laying out the Money arising by such Sale in England, for the Use of the said Anne Bridges.}}

| {{|Enabling Cyriac Weslyd to sell part of his estate, which by marriage articles was agreed to be settled upon his wife and children, and to settle the other part to the same uses.|private|44|04-05-1699|note3=|repealed=n|archived=n|An Act for the enabling Cyriac Weslyd Esquire to sell some Part of his Estate, which, by Articles upon his Marriage, was agreed to be settled upon his Wife and Children; and for the settling of other Part of his Estate, of better Value, to the same Uses.}}

| {{|Freedom of ships "Hawke" and "Rainbow" to trade as English-built ships.|private|45|04-05-1699|note3=|repealed=n|archived=n|An Act for the Ships Hawke and Rainbow to trade as English-built Ships.}}

| {{|John Bull's (an infant) estate: sale of lands in Kent for payment of debts and annuities and for provision for younger children.|private|46|04-05-1699|note3=|repealed=n|archived=n|An Act to enable John Bull, an Infant, to sell his Lands in Kent, for the Payment of Debts and Annuities charged thereon; and for Provision of Younger Children.}}

| {{|Sir William Pulteney's estate: enabling the grant of leases for payment of debts of William Pulteney, his son.|private|47|04-05-1699|note3=|repealed=n|archived=n|An Act for the enabling the surviving Trustee of Sir William Pulteney Knight, deceased, to make Leases, for the raising Monies, for Payment of his Son William Pulteney's Debts, and other Purposes therein mentioned.}}

| {{|Enabling Popham Conway and Francis and Charles Seymour to lease their estates.|private|48|04-05-1699|note3=|repealed=n|archived=n|An Act to enable Popham Conway, Francis Seymour, and Charles Seymour, Esquires, and their Issue Male, severally and successively, to make Leases of their Estates.}}

| {{|Zenobia Hough's estate: sale for payment of her husband's debts.|private|49|04-05-1699|note3=|repealed=n|archived=n|An Act for the Sale of the Estate of Zenobia Hough, for the Payment of the Debts of her Husband, and other Uses.}}

| {{|Freedom of ship "Hope" (of great length and very serviceable for importing masts) to trade as an English-built ship.|private|50|04-05-1699|note3=|repealed=n|archived=n|An Act to enable the Ship Hope (of great Length, and very serviceable for bringing Masts into this Kingdom) to trade as an English-built Ship.}}

| {{|John Athy's estate: enabling William Wrayford and Dame Ann Rich to lease houses and ground in Covent Garden.|private|51|04-05-1699|note3=|repealed=n|archived=n|An Act to enable William Wrayford Gentleman, and Dame Anne Rich Widow, to make Leases of Houses and Ground in Covent Garden, late the Estate of John Athy, Citizen and Haberdasher of London.}}

| {{|Sir Francis Andrews' estate: sale of manor of Downham (Essex) and purchase of other lands.|private|52|04-05-1699|note3=|repealed=n|archived=n|An Act for Sale of the Manor of Downham, in the County of Essex (the Estate of Sir Francis Andrews); and for buying and settling other Lands to the same Uses.}}

| {{|Ships "King William" and "Charles the Second:" discharge from penalties of the Act of navigation.|private|53|04-05-1699|note3=|repealed=n|archived=n|An Act to discharge the Ships King William and Charles the Second from the Penalties of the Act of Navigation.}}

| {{|Enabling Thomas Methwold to raise £1,200 upon his estate for improvements made to it.|private|54|04-05-1699|note3=|repealed=n|archived=n|An Act to enable Thomas Methwold Esquire to raise the Sum of Twelve Hundred Pounds upon his Estate, by him laid out in improving the same.}}

| {{|Thomas Cowslade's (an infant) estate: sale of freehold and leasehold houses to discharge a mortgage and purchase other lands.|private|55|04-05-1699|repealed=n|archived=n|An Act for settling divers Freehold and Leasehold Houses, the Estate of Thomas Cowslade, an Infant, and others, to discharge a Mortgage, and to purchase other Lands, to be settled to the like Uses.}}

| {{|Naturalization of Augustine Cloribus and others.|private|56|04-05-1699|note3=|repealed=n|archived=n|An Act for naturalizing Augustine Cloribus and others.}}

| {{|Naturalization of Samuel Bernadeau, Peter Chantreau des Gaudree and others belonging to His Majesty's Guards and Grenadiers.|private|57|04-05-1699|note3=|repealed=n|archived=n|An Act for naturalizing Samuel Bernardeau, Peter Chantreau des Gaudree, and others, Private Gentlemen belonging to His Majesty's Three Troops of Guards and Grenadiers.}}

| {{|Naturalization of Richard Legg and others.|private|58|04-05-1699|note3=|repealed=n|archived=n|An Act to naturalize Richard Legg and others.}}

| {{|Naturalization of Sir David Collier, Isaac la Melionere, Peter de Belcastel and William Reiatore.|private|59|04-05-1699|note3=|repealed=n|archived=n|An Act for naturalizing Sir David Collier, Isaac La Melionere, Peter de Belcastel, and William Rietourt.}}
}}

1699

11 Will. 3

Public Acts

| {{|Crown Lands, Forfeited Estates Act 1698|public|2|11-04-1700|repealed=y|archived=n|An Act for granting an Aid to His Majesty by Sale of the forfeited and other Estates and Interests in Ireland and by a Land Tax in England for the severall Purposes therein mentioned.}}

| {{|Taxation Act 1698|public|3|11-04-1700|repealed=y|archived=n|An Act for laying further Duties upon wrought Silks Muslins and some other Commodities of the East-Indies and for enlargeing the Time for purchasing certaine reversionary Annuities therein mentioned.|note4= }}

| {{|Popery Act 1698|public|4|11-04-1700|repealed=y|archived=n|An Act for the further preventing the Growth of Popery.}}

| {{|Dover Harbour Act 1698|public|5|11-04-1700|repealed=y|archived=n|An Act for the Repaire of Dover Harbour.}}

| {{|Aliens Act 1698|public|6|11-04-1700|repealed=y|archived=n|An Act to enable His Majesties naturall borne Subjects to inherite the Estate of their Ancestors either lineall or collaterall notwithstanding their Father or Mother were Aliens.}}

| {{|Piracy Act 1698|public|7|11-04-1700|repealed=y|archived=n|An Act for the more effectuall Suppressions of Piracy.}}

| {{|Debts Due to the Army, etc. Act 1698|public|8|11-04-1700|repealed=y|archived=n|An Act for the appointing Commissioners to take examine and determine the Debts due to the Army Navy and for Transport-Service and alsoe an Account of the Prizes taken during the late Warr.|note4= }}

| {{|Frivolous Suits Act 1698|public|9|11-04-1700|repealed=y|archived=n|An Act for preventing of frivolous and vexatious Suits in the Principality of Wales and the Counties Palatine.}}

| {{|Encouragement of Manufactures Act 1698|public|10|11-04-1700|repealed=y|archived=n|An Act for the more effectuall imploying the Poor by incourageing the Manufactures of this Kingdom.|note4= }}

| {{|Repeal of 9 W. 3. c. 9. Act 1698|public|11|11-04-1700|repealed=y|archived=n|An Act to repeale an Act made in the Ninth Yeare of His Majesties Reigne intituled An Act for rendring the Laws more effectuall for preventing the Importation of Forreigne Bone-Lace Loom-Lace Needle-Worke Point and Cut-Worke Three Months after the Prohibition of the Woollen Manufactures in Flanders shall be taken off.|note4= }}

| {{|Governors of Plantations Act 1698|public|12|11-04-1700|repealed=y|archived=n|An Act to punish Governors of Plantations in this Kingdom for Crimes by them committed in the Plantations.}}

| {{|Exportation Act 1698|public|13|11-04-1700|repealed=y|archived=n|An Act for continueing severall Laws therein mentioned, and for explaining the Act intituled An Act to prevent the Exportation of Wooll out of the Kingdoms of Ireland and England into Forreigne Parts and for the Incouragement of the Woollen Manufactures in the Kingdom of England.|note4= }}

| {{|Militia Act 1698|public|14|11-04-1700|repealed=y|archived=n|An Act for raiseing the Militia for the Yeare One thousand seaven hundred although the Months pay formerly advanced be not repaid.|note4= }}

| {{|Ale Measures Act 1698|public|15|11-04-1700|repealed=y|archived=n|An Act for the ascertaining the Measures for retailing Ale and Beer.|note4= }}

| {{|Tithes of Hemp and Flax Act 1698|public|16|11-04-1700|repealed=y|archived=n|An Act for the better ascertaining the Tythes of Hemp and Flax.}}

| {{|Signing the Association, etc. Act 1698|public|17|11-04-1700|repealed=y|archived=n|An Act to prevent Disputes that may arise by Officers and Members of Corporations haveing neglected to signe the Association and takeing the Oaths in due Time.|note4= }}

| {{|Vagrancy Act 1698|public|18|11-04-1700|repealed=y|archived=n|An Act for the more effectuall Punishment of Vagrants and sending them whither by Law they ought to be sent.}}

| {{|Gaols Act 1698|public|19|11-04-1700|repealed=y|archived=n|An Act to enable Justices of Peace to build and repair Goales in their respective Counties.}}

| {{|Taxation Act 1698|public|20|11-04-1700|repealed=y|archived=n|An Act for takeing away the Duties upon the Woollen Manufactures, Corn Grain Bread Biscuit and Meal exported.|note4= }}

| {{|Thames Watermen Act 1698|public|21|11-04-1700|repealed=y|archived=n|An Act for the Explanation and better Execution of former Acts made touching Watermen and Wherrymen rowing on the River of Thames and for the better ordering and governing the said Watermen Wherrymen and Lightermen upon the said River between Gravesend and Windsor.}}

| {{|River Lark Act 1698|public|22|11-04-1700|repealed=y|archived=n|An Act for makeing the River Larke alias Burn Navigable.}}

| {{|Bristol Roads and Avon and Frome Navigation Act 1698|public|23|11-04-1700|repealed=y|archived=n|An Act for the better preserving the Navigation of the Rivers Avon and Froome and for cleansing paving and inlightning the Streets of the City of Bristoll.}}

| {{|River Dee, Chester Act 1698|public|24|11-04-1700|repealed=y|archived=n|An Act to enable the Mayor and Citizens of the City of Chester to recover and preserve the Navigation upon the River Dee.}}
}}

Private Acts

| {{|Duke of Norfolk's divorce from Lady Mary Mordant.|private|2|11-04-1700|repealed=n|archived=n|An Act to dissolve the Duke of Norfolk's Marriage with the Lady Mary Mordant, and to enable him to marry again.}}

| {{|Ann Baldwin's estate: sale of a capital messuage and lands called Wiltons and other lands in Buckinghamshire.|private|3|16-11-1699|note3=|repealed=n|archived=n|An Act for the better enabling Anne Baldwin Widow to sell a Capital Messuage and Lands called Wiltons, and other Lands, in the County of Bucks, devised by her Husband's Will.}}
}}
 Arthur Lacy's estate: sale of lands and manors for payment of mortgage and purchase of demesne lands to be settled to the same uses. c. 9
 Bluett Wallop's estate: sale of inheritance of a twelfth part of several manors, lands and tenements during his minority and purchasing others. c. 27
 Bryan Janson's estate: sale for payment of debts and provision for wife and children. c. 31
 Catherine Fitzgerald Villiers' estate: settling, raising money for payment of debts and securing portions for her five younger children by her late husband Edward Fitzgerald Villiers. c. 16
 Charging estate of Sir Thomas Robinson with £7000 for his sister Ann's portion and settlement of her estate on him in lieu. c. 14
 Charles Hore's estate: sale of part for payment of debts and settling other part to raise a portion and maintenance for Elizabeth his daughter by his former wife and making a jointure for his present wife Mary and provision for their children. c. 25
 Confirmation of a lease and indentures between the city of Norwich and Richard Barry, George Sorocold and Richard Soame and for lighting Norwich's streets. c. 15
 Confirmation of a lease of ground for the rector and churchwardens of the parish of St. Martins Ogars, London, to build a church for worship in French according to the usage of the Church of England. c. 30
 Continuing the Governor and Company of Merchants of London trading to the East Indies a Corporation. c. 4
 Enabling Dalby Thomas to sell lands in Islington (Middlesex) settled on his marriage by Dorothy, his wife, as part of her jointure, he settling another estate in lieu. c. 26
 Enabling Edward Mansell to sell or mortgage the impropriate rectories of Llanriddian and Penrice [Glamorgan] for payment of debts and raising portions for younger children, and settling the manor of Henleys and other lands. c. 17
 Enabling Leonard Wessell to sell the manor of Acres-Fleet (Essex), settled on his marriage with Sarah his wife as part of her jointure, and to purchase other lands. c. 28
 Enabling Thomas May to sell lands in Suffolk settled on his marriage and to convey others to the same uses. c. 7
 Freedom of ship "Martha of Margam."  c. 32
 George Harrison's estate: sale of reversion and inheritance of farm of Nethercote (Oxfordshire) for payment of debts and legacies. c. 18
 Henry Butler's estate in Lancashire: leasing of part for discharging incumbrances. c. 21
 John Clobery's estate: payment of debts and raising portions and maintenance for children. c. 6
 Joseph and Sarah Gardiner's estate: sale for payment of debts and legacies and applying residue upon specified trusts. c. 8
 Making a convenient way out of Chancery Lane to Lincoln's Inn Fields. c. 11
 Naturalization of Francis Vandertyd, Agneta Vandermersch, Henry Lowman and James Gabriel Le Tresor. c. 37
 Naturalization of Isaac Delagard, John Batero and others. c. 38
 Naturalization of John Bourges and others. c. 35
 Naturalization of John Ricard and Jacob Dabbadie. c. 36
 Naturalization of Oliver D'Harcourt and others. c. 34
 Naturalization of Theodore Jacobson and others. c. 33
 Philip Holman's estate: supplying the loss of indentures of lease and release to George Holman his son. c. 20
 Rectifying a mistake in Thomas Hopwood's marriage settlement in order to raise portions for younger children and pay debts. c. 5
 Robert and John Merefield's estate: settlement and ascertaining proportions between Robert's widow and his children. c. 12
 Sale of manor of Fenham (Northumberland) for payment of debts of Thomas Riddell and his son Edward and raising portions for Thomas' daughters. c. 24
 Settlement of differences concerning Dame Mary Bond's will and performance of it. c. 13
 Sir Josiah Child's estate: vesting land in trustees for better performance of covenants entered into upon marriage of his eldest son to Sir Thomas Cooke's daughter. c. 19
 Taking the estate in law of messuages and lands mortgaged to Jeffery and Samuel Howland and their heirs "out of" Marquis of Tavistock and his lady. c. 29
 Thomas Barlow's estate: confirmation of sale of manor of Stansall and tenements in Yorkshire, settling other lands to the same uses and purchase of other lands to be so settled. c. 23
 Thomas Cowper's estate: vesting part in trustees for payment of debts. c. 22
 Thomas Siderfin's estate: sale of manor of Exton and other lands in Somerset for payment of debts. c. 10

See also
List of Acts of the Parliament of England

References

External links
The Statutes at Large 
Volume 8 – 12 Charles II to Last James II – 1660 to 1685
Volume 9 – 1 William and Mary to 8 William III – 1688 to 1695–96 – also
Volume 10 – 8 William III to 2 Anne – 1696–97 to 1703

 
1660
17th century in England